

478001–478100 

|-bgcolor=#d6d6d6
| 478001 ||  || — || October 16, 2006 || Kitt Peak || Spacewatch || — || align=right | 1.7 km || 
|-id=002 bgcolor=#d6d6d6
| 478002 ||  || — || September 20, 2011 || Kitt Peak || Spacewatch || — || align=right | 2.0 km || 
|-id=003 bgcolor=#d6d6d6
| 478003 ||  || — || September 30, 2006 || Mount Lemmon || Mount Lemmon Survey || — || align=right | 1.8 km || 
|-id=004 bgcolor=#d6d6d6
| 478004 ||  || — || November 23, 2006 || Kitt Peak || Spacewatch || — || align=right | 2.3 km || 
|-id=005 bgcolor=#d6d6d6
| 478005 ||  || — || September 30, 2006 || Catalina || CSS || — || align=right | 2.9 km || 
|-id=006 bgcolor=#d6d6d6
| 478006 ||  || — || August 6, 2010 || WISE || WISE || — || align=right | 2.5 km || 
|-id=007 bgcolor=#d6d6d6
| 478007 ||  || — || September 19, 2006 || Kitt Peak || Spacewatch || KOR || align=right | 1.1 km || 
|-id=008 bgcolor=#d6d6d6
| 478008 ||  || — || May 15, 2009 || Kitt Peak || Spacewatch || EOS || align=right | 1.7 km || 
|-id=009 bgcolor=#d6d6d6
| 478009 ||  || — || September 24, 2011 || Kitt Peak || Spacewatch || — || align=right | 2.4 km || 
|-id=010 bgcolor=#d6d6d6
| 478010 ||  || — || February 12, 2008 || Mount Lemmon || Mount Lemmon Survey || EOS || align=right | 1.9 km || 
|-id=011 bgcolor=#d6d6d6
| 478011 ||  || — || February 9, 2008 || Kitt Peak || Spacewatch || — || align=right | 2.6 km || 
|-id=012 bgcolor=#d6d6d6
| 478012 ||  || — || January 30, 2008 || Mount Lemmon || Mount Lemmon Survey || — || align=right | 2.5 km || 
|-id=013 bgcolor=#fefefe
| 478013 ||  || — || September 26, 2011 || Kitt Peak || Spacewatch || H || align=right data-sort-value="0.61" | 610 m || 
|-id=014 bgcolor=#d6d6d6
| 478014 ||  || — || January 20, 2009 || Kitt Peak || Spacewatch || — || align=right | 2.4 km || 
|-id=015 bgcolor=#E9E9E9
| 478015 ||  || — || September 23, 2011 || Socorro || LINEAR || GEF || align=right | 1.6 km || 
|-id=016 bgcolor=#E9E9E9
| 478016 ||  || — || November 19, 2007 || Kitt Peak || Spacewatch || — || align=right | 2.0 km || 
|-id=017 bgcolor=#d6d6d6
| 478017 ||  || — || August 19, 2006 || Kitt Peak || Spacewatch || KOR || align=right | 1.1 km || 
|-id=018 bgcolor=#E9E9E9
| 478018 ||  || — || February 1, 2009 || Kitt Peak || Spacewatch || — || align=right | 1.8 km || 
|-id=019 bgcolor=#d6d6d6
| 478019 ||  || — || September 17, 2006 || Kitt Peak || Spacewatch || — || align=right | 1.9 km || 
|-id=020 bgcolor=#d6d6d6
| 478020 ||  || — || November 3, 1997 || Kitt Peak || Spacewatch || — || align=right | 1.8 km || 
|-id=021 bgcolor=#d6d6d6
| 478021 ||  || — || September 15, 2006 || Kitt Peak || Spacewatch || EOS || align=right | 1.4 km || 
|-id=022 bgcolor=#E9E9E9
| 478022 ||  || — || March 3, 2005 || Catalina || CSS || — || align=right | 2.9 km || 
|-id=023 bgcolor=#d6d6d6
| 478023 ||  || — || December 16, 2007 || Mount Lemmon || Mount Lemmon Survey || — || align=right | 2.5 km || 
|-id=024 bgcolor=#d6d6d6
| 478024 ||  || — || September 20, 2011 || Kitt Peak || Spacewatch || HYG || align=right | 2.5 km || 
|-id=025 bgcolor=#d6d6d6
| 478025 ||  || — || September 18, 2011 || Mount Lemmon || Mount Lemmon Survey || — || align=right | 2.2 km || 
|-id=026 bgcolor=#E9E9E9
| 478026 ||  || — || September 24, 2011 || Mount Lemmon || Mount Lemmon Survey || — || align=right | 2.3 km || 
|-id=027 bgcolor=#d6d6d6
| 478027 ||  || — || October 19, 2006 || Catalina || CSS || — || align=right | 2.3 km || 
|-id=028 bgcolor=#d6d6d6
| 478028 ||  || — || December 18, 2001 || Socorro || LINEAR || EOS || align=right | 2.3 km || 
|-id=029 bgcolor=#E9E9E9
| 478029 ||  || — || October 14, 2007 || Mount Lemmon || Mount Lemmon Survey || AGN || align=right | 1.2 km || 
|-id=030 bgcolor=#d6d6d6
| 478030 ||  || — || September 24, 2011 || Mount Lemmon || Mount Lemmon Survey || — || align=right | 1.9 km || 
|-id=031 bgcolor=#d6d6d6
| 478031 ||  || — || September 26, 2011 || Mount Lemmon || Mount Lemmon Survey || KOR || align=right | 1.2 km || 
|-id=032 bgcolor=#d6d6d6
| 478032 ||  || — || September 8, 2011 || Kitt Peak || Spacewatch || — || align=right | 2.3 km || 
|-id=033 bgcolor=#d6d6d6
| 478033 ||  || — || September 8, 2011 || Kitt Peak || Spacewatch || — || align=right | 2.4 km || 
|-id=034 bgcolor=#d6d6d6
| 478034 ||  || — || July 15, 2005 || Mount Lemmon || Mount Lemmon Survey || EOS || align=right | 1.7 km || 
|-id=035 bgcolor=#E9E9E9
| 478035 ||  || — || December 16, 2007 || Kitt Peak || Spacewatch || DOR || align=right | 2.3 km || 
|-id=036 bgcolor=#d6d6d6
| 478036 ||  || — || September 20, 2011 || Kitt Peak || Spacewatch || EOS || align=right | 1.8 km || 
|-id=037 bgcolor=#d6d6d6
| 478037 ||  || — || November 11, 2006 || Mount Lemmon || Mount Lemmon Survey || THM || align=right | 1.6 km || 
|-id=038 bgcolor=#d6d6d6
| 478038 ||  || — || January 18, 2008 || Mount Lemmon || Mount Lemmon Survey || EOS || align=right | 1.6 km || 
|-id=039 bgcolor=#d6d6d6
| 478039 ||  || — || October 27, 2006 || Kitt Peak || Spacewatch || — || align=right | 1.9 km || 
|-id=040 bgcolor=#d6d6d6
| 478040 ||  || — || September 24, 2011 || Mount Lemmon || Mount Lemmon Survey || — || align=right | 2.7 km || 
|-id=041 bgcolor=#d6d6d6
| 478041 ||  || — || September 24, 2011 || Mount Lemmon || Mount Lemmon Survey || — || align=right | 2.9 km || 
|-id=042 bgcolor=#d6d6d6
| 478042 ||  || — || September 26, 2011 || Catalina || CSS || — || align=right | 3.0 km || 
|-id=043 bgcolor=#d6d6d6
| 478043 ||  || — || September 26, 2011 || Mount Lemmon || Mount Lemmon Survey || — || align=right | 2.6 km || 
|-id=044 bgcolor=#d6d6d6
| 478044 ||  || — || October 18, 1995 || Kitt Peak || Spacewatch || — || align=right | 2.3 km || 
|-id=045 bgcolor=#d6d6d6
| 478045 ||  || — || September 29, 2011 || Mount Lemmon || Mount Lemmon Survey || EOS || align=right | 1.3 km || 
|-id=046 bgcolor=#d6d6d6
| 478046 ||  || — || September 21, 2011 || Kitt Peak || Spacewatch || — || align=right | 2.7 km || 
|-id=047 bgcolor=#d6d6d6
| 478047 ||  || — || November 18, 2006 || Kitt Peak || Spacewatch || — || align=right | 2.2 km || 
|-id=048 bgcolor=#d6d6d6
| 478048 ||  || — || September 15, 2006 || Kitt Peak || Spacewatch || KOR || align=right | 1.1 km || 
|-id=049 bgcolor=#d6d6d6
| 478049 ||  || — || September 15, 2006 || Kitt Peak || Spacewatch || KOR || align=right | 1.0 km || 
|-id=050 bgcolor=#d6d6d6
| 478050 ||  || — || October 27, 2006 || Mount Lemmon || Mount Lemmon Survey || — || align=right | 2.6 km || 
|-id=051 bgcolor=#d6d6d6
| 478051 ||  || — || November 14, 2006 || Mount Lemmon || Mount Lemmon Survey || EOS || align=right | 2.0 km || 
|-id=052 bgcolor=#E9E9E9
| 478052 ||  || — || September 19, 2011 || Catalina || CSS || MRX || align=right | 1.2 km || 
|-id=053 bgcolor=#d6d6d6
| 478053 ||  || — || January 10, 2008 || Mount Lemmon || Mount Lemmon Survey || — || align=right | 2.3 km || 
|-id=054 bgcolor=#d6d6d6
| 478054 ||  || — || February 9, 2008 || Kitt Peak || Spacewatch || — || align=right | 3.0 km || 
|-id=055 bgcolor=#E9E9E9
| 478055 ||  || — || September 8, 2011 || Kitt Peak || Spacewatch || GEF || align=right | 1.1 km || 
|-id=056 bgcolor=#d6d6d6
| 478056 ||  || — || September 20, 2011 || Kitt Peak || Spacewatch || KOR || align=right | 1.3 km || 
|-id=057 bgcolor=#fefefe
| 478057 ||  || — || October 1, 2011 || Mount Lemmon || Mount Lemmon Survey || H || align=right data-sort-value="0.59" | 590 m || 
|-id=058 bgcolor=#d6d6d6
| 478058 ||  || — || September 8, 2011 || Kitt Peak || Spacewatch || — || align=right | 2.2 km || 
|-id=059 bgcolor=#d6d6d6
| 478059 ||  || — || September 22, 2011 || Catalina || CSS || — || align=right | 3.0 km || 
|-id=060 bgcolor=#d6d6d6
| 478060 ||  || — || October 3, 2006 || Mount Lemmon || Mount Lemmon Survey || — || align=right | 2.2 km || 
|-id=061 bgcolor=#E9E9E9
| 478061 ||  || — || October 31, 2002 || Kitt Peak || Spacewatch || DOR || align=right | 2.2 km || 
|-id=062 bgcolor=#d6d6d6
| 478062 ||  || — || September 22, 2011 || Kitt Peak || Spacewatch || — || align=right | 3.0 km || 
|-id=063 bgcolor=#d6d6d6
| 478063 ||  || — || September 20, 2000 || Kitt Peak || Spacewatch || — || align=right | 2.9 km || 
|-id=064 bgcolor=#d6d6d6
| 478064 ||  || — || September 25, 2006 || Mount Lemmon || Mount Lemmon Survey || KOR || align=right | 1.0 km || 
|-id=065 bgcolor=#d6d6d6
| 478065 ||  || — || May 20, 2010 || WISE || WISE || — || align=right | 3.5 km || 
|-id=066 bgcolor=#d6d6d6
| 478066 ||  || — || April 27, 2009 || Mount Lemmon || Mount Lemmon Survey || — || align=right | 3.3 km || 
|-id=067 bgcolor=#d6d6d6
| 478067 ||  || — || October 18, 2011 || Mount Lemmon || Mount Lemmon Survey || — || align=right | 2.1 km || 
|-id=068 bgcolor=#d6d6d6
| 478068 ||  || — || October 18, 2011 || Mount Lemmon || Mount Lemmon Survey || — || align=right | 3.0 km || 
|-id=069 bgcolor=#d6d6d6
| 478069 ||  || — || December 13, 2006 || Mount Lemmon || Mount Lemmon Survey || — || align=right | 2.2 km || 
|-id=070 bgcolor=#d6d6d6
| 478070 ||  || — || August 30, 2005 || Kitt Peak || Spacewatch || — || align=right | 2.4 km || 
|-id=071 bgcolor=#d6d6d6
| 478071 ||  || — || October 29, 2000 || Kitt Peak || Spacewatch || — || align=right | 2.8 km || 
|-id=072 bgcolor=#E9E9E9
| 478072 ||  || — || November 2, 2007 || Mount Lemmon || Mount Lemmon Survey || — || align=right | 2.2 km || 
|-id=073 bgcolor=#E9E9E9
| 478073 ||  || — || September 19, 2011 || Mount Lemmon || Mount Lemmon Survey || — || align=right | 2.1 km || 
|-id=074 bgcolor=#d6d6d6
| 478074 ||  || — || November 22, 2006 || Kitt Peak || Spacewatch || — || align=right | 2.0 km || 
|-id=075 bgcolor=#d6d6d6
| 478075 ||  || — || October 13, 2006 || Kitt Peak || Spacewatch || — || align=right | 2.9 km || 
|-id=076 bgcolor=#d6d6d6
| 478076 ||  || — || October 17, 2011 || Kitt Peak || Spacewatch || — || align=right | 2.5 km || 
|-id=077 bgcolor=#d6d6d6
| 478077 ||  || — || October 17, 2011 || Kitt Peak || Spacewatch || — || align=right | 2.5 km || 
|-id=078 bgcolor=#d6d6d6
| 478078 ||  || — || May 2, 2008 || Mount Lemmon || Mount Lemmon Survey || — || align=right | 2.9 km || 
|-id=079 bgcolor=#d6d6d6
| 478079 ||  || — || September 4, 2010 || Mount Lemmon || Mount Lemmon Survey || — || align=right | 2.9 km || 
|-id=080 bgcolor=#d6d6d6
| 478080 ||  || — || April 11, 2010 || WISE || WISE || — || align=right | 4.9 km || 
|-id=081 bgcolor=#d6d6d6
| 478081 ||  || — || October 18, 2011 || Mount Lemmon || Mount Lemmon Survey || — || align=right | 2.7 km || 
|-id=082 bgcolor=#d6d6d6
| 478082 ||  || — || December 16, 2006 || Catalina || CSS || — || align=right | 3.3 km || 
|-id=083 bgcolor=#d6d6d6
| 478083 ||  || — || September 22, 2011 || Kitt Peak || Spacewatch || VER || align=right | 2.4 km || 
|-id=084 bgcolor=#d6d6d6
| 478084 ||  || — || September 23, 2005 || Kitt Peak || Spacewatch || VER || align=right | 3.2 km || 
|-id=085 bgcolor=#d6d6d6
| 478085 ||  || — || November 15, 1995 || Kitt Peak || Spacewatch || — || align=right | 2.1 km || 
|-id=086 bgcolor=#d6d6d6
| 478086 ||  || — || September 28, 2011 || Mount Lemmon || Mount Lemmon Survey || — || align=right | 2.1 km || 
|-id=087 bgcolor=#d6d6d6
| 478087 ||  || — || November 23, 2006 || Mount Lemmon || Mount Lemmon Survey || — || align=right | 2.0 km || 
|-id=088 bgcolor=#d6d6d6
| 478088 ||  || — || September 27, 2006 || Mount Lemmon || Mount Lemmon Survey || KOR || align=right | 1.2 km || 
|-id=089 bgcolor=#d6d6d6
| 478089 ||  || — || September 28, 2011 || Mount Lemmon || Mount Lemmon Survey || — || align=right | 2.6 km || 
|-id=090 bgcolor=#d6d6d6
| 478090 ||  || — || September 23, 2011 || Kitt Peak || Spacewatch || — || align=right | 3.0 km || 
|-id=091 bgcolor=#d6d6d6
| 478091 ||  || — || October 21, 2006 || Mount Lemmon || Mount Lemmon Survey || — || align=right | 2.2 km || 
|-id=092 bgcolor=#d6d6d6
| 478092 ||  || — || August 30, 2005 || Kitt Peak || Spacewatch || THM || align=right | 2.1 km || 
|-id=093 bgcolor=#d6d6d6
| 478093 ||  || — || September 21, 2011 || Mount Lemmon || Mount Lemmon Survey || EOS || align=right | 2.0 km || 
|-id=094 bgcolor=#d6d6d6
| 478094 ||  || — || October 18, 2011 || Kitt Peak || Spacewatch || — || align=right | 3.0 km || 
|-id=095 bgcolor=#d6d6d6
| 478095 ||  || — || March 3, 2008 || Mount Lemmon || Mount Lemmon Survey || — || align=right | 3.0 km || 
|-id=096 bgcolor=#d6d6d6
| 478096 ||  || — || October 18, 2011 || Kitt Peak || Spacewatch || — || align=right | 2.9 km || 
|-id=097 bgcolor=#d6d6d6
| 478097 ||  || — || April 29, 2009 || Kitt Peak || Spacewatch || EOS || align=right | 2.2 km || 
|-id=098 bgcolor=#d6d6d6
| 478098 ||  || — || September 30, 2006 || Mount Lemmon || Mount Lemmon Survey || TEL || align=right | 1.0 km || 
|-id=099 bgcolor=#d6d6d6
| 478099 ||  || — || October 21, 2011 || Mount Lemmon || Mount Lemmon Survey || — || align=right | 3.0 km || 
|-id=100 bgcolor=#d6d6d6
| 478100 ||  || — || October 21, 2011 || Mount Lemmon || Mount Lemmon Survey || — || align=right | 2.4 km || 
|}

478101–478200 

|-bgcolor=#d6d6d6
| 478101 ||  || — || November 12, 2006 || Mount Lemmon || Mount Lemmon Survey || — || align=right | 1.8 km || 
|-id=102 bgcolor=#d6d6d6
| 478102 ||  || — || October 21, 1995 || Kitt Peak || Spacewatch || EOS || align=right | 1.5 km || 
|-id=103 bgcolor=#d6d6d6
| 478103 ||  || — || September 20, 2011 || Mount Lemmon || Mount Lemmon Survey || — || align=right | 2.1 km || 
|-id=104 bgcolor=#d6d6d6
| 478104 ||  || — || November 20, 2006 || Kitt Peak || Spacewatch || — || align=right | 2.4 km || 
|-id=105 bgcolor=#d6d6d6
| 478105 ||  || — || September 28, 2011 || Kitt Peak || Spacewatch || EOS || align=right | 1.9 km || 
|-id=106 bgcolor=#d6d6d6
| 478106 ||  || — || October 19, 2011 || Kitt Peak || Spacewatch || — || align=right | 2.9 km || 
|-id=107 bgcolor=#d6d6d6
| 478107 ||  || — || October 25, 2000 || Socorro || LINEAR || LIX || align=right | 4.6 km || 
|-id=108 bgcolor=#d6d6d6
| 478108 ||  || — || September 23, 2011 || Mount Lemmon || Mount Lemmon Survey || — || align=right | 3.7 km || 
|-id=109 bgcolor=#d6d6d6
| 478109 ||  || — || October 19, 2011 || Kitt Peak || Spacewatch || — || align=right | 2.8 km || 
|-id=110 bgcolor=#d6d6d6
| 478110 ||  || — || October 19, 2011 || Kitt Peak || Spacewatch || — || align=right | 2.9 km || 
|-id=111 bgcolor=#d6d6d6
| 478111 ||  || — || October 19, 2011 || Kitt Peak || Spacewatch || — || align=right | 3.2 km || 
|-id=112 bgcolor=#d6d6d6
| 478112 ||  || — || September 27, 2011 || Mount Lemmon || Mount Lemmon Survey || — || align=right | 3.3 km || 
|-id=113 bgcolor=#d6d6d6
| 478113 ||  || — || July 4, 2010 || Kitt Peak || Spacewatch || EOS || align=right | 2.2 km || 
|-id=114 bgcolor=#d6d6d6
| 478114 ||  || — || May 21, 2010 || WISE || WISE || — || align=right | 2.8 km || 
|-id=115 bgcolor=#d6d6d6
| 478115 ||  || — || May 31, 2010 || WISE || WISE || — || align=right | 3.3 km || 
|-id=116 bgcolor=#d6d6d6
| 478116 ||  || — || September 29, 2005 || Mount Lemmon || Mount Lemmon Survey || THMcritical || align=right | 1.8 km || 
|-id=117 bgcolor=#d6d6d6
| 478117 ||  || — || October 19, 2011 || Mount Lemmon || Mount Lemmon Survey || — || align=right | 1.9 km || 
|-id=118 bgcolor=#d6d6d6
| 478118 ||  || — || October 20, 2011 || Kitt Peak || Spacewatch || — || align=right | 2.5 km || 
|-id=119 bgcolor=#d6d6d6
| 478119 ||  || — || October 20, 2011 || Kitt Peak || Spacewatch || — || align=right | 3.4 km || 
|-id=120 bgcolor=#d6d6d6
| 478120 ||  || — || October 20, 2011 || Mount Lemmon || Mount Lemmon Survey || — || align=right | 3.2 km || 
|-id=121 bgcolor=#d6d6d6
| 478121 ||  || — || June 6, 2010 || WISE || WISE || URS || align=right | 3.3 km || 
|-id=122 bgcolor=#d6d6d6
| 478122 ||  || — || September 23, 2011 || Mount Lemmon || Mount Lemmon Survey || EOS || align=right | 2.0 km || 
|-id=123 bgcolor=#d6d6d6
| 478123 ||  || — || October 21, 2011 || Mount Lemmon || Mount Lemmon Survey || — || align=right | 3.1 km || 
|-id=124 bgcolor=#d6d6d6
| 478124 ||  || — || November 16, 2006 || Kitt Peak || Spacewatch || — || align=right | 2.3 km || 
|-id=125 bgcolor=#d6d6d6
| 478125 ||  || — || November 15, 2006 || Mount Lemmon || Mount Lemmon Survey || — || align=right | 2.3 km || 
|-id=126 bgcolor=#d6d6d6
| 478126 ||  || — || September 24, 2011 || Mount Lemmon || Mount Lemmon Survey || — || align=right | 3.6 km || 
|-id=127 bgcolor=#d6d6d6
| 478127 ||  || — || September 25, 2005 || Kitt Peak || Spacewatch || VER || align=right | 2.7 km || 
|-id=128 bgcolor=#E9E9E9
| 478128 ||  || — || October 19, 2011 || Mount Lemmon || Mount Lemmon Survey || — || align=right | 2.3 km || 
|-id=129 bgcolor=#d6d6d6
| 478129 ||  || — || October 18, 2011 || Mount Lemmon || Mount Lemmon Survey || — || align=right | 3.7 km || 
|-id=130 bgcolor=#d6d6d6
| 478130 ||  || — || July 5, 2005 || Mount Lemmon || Mount Lemmon Survey || — || align=right | 2.4 km || 
|-id=131 bgcolor=#d6d6d6
| 478131 ||  || — || September 21, 2011 || Kitt Peak || Spacewatch || THM || align=right | 2.4 km || 
|-id=132 bgcolor=#d6d6d6
| 478132 ||  || — || November 16, 2006 || Kitt Peak || Spacewatch || — || align=right | 2.0 km || 
|-id=133 bgcolor=#fefefe
| 478133 ||  || — || September 28, 2003 || Kitt Peak || Spacewatch || H || align=right data-sort-value="0.75" | 750 m || 
|-id=134 bgcolor=#d6d6d6
| 478134 ||  || — || March 28, 2009 || Kitt Peak || Spacewatch || — || align=right | 3.2 km || 
|-id=135 bgcolor=#d6d6d6
| 478135 ||  || — || December 5, 2007 || Kitt Peak || Spacewatch || — || align=right | 2.1 km || 
|-id=136 bgcolor=#d6d6d6
| 478136 ||  || — || September 18, 1995 || Kitt Peak || Spacewatch || — || align=right | 2.0 km || 
|-id=137 bgcolor=#d6d6d6
| 478137 ||  || — || October 20, 2011 || Kitt Peak || Spacewatch || — || align=right | 3.2 km || 
|-id=138 bgcolor=#d6d6d6
| 478138 ||  || — || November 18, 1995 || Kitt Peak || Spacewatch || EOS || align=right | 1.6 km || 
|-id=139 bgcolor=#d6d6d6
| 478139 ||  || — || October 20, 2011 || Mount Lemmon || Mount Lemmon Survey || — || align=right | 3.7 km || 
|-id=140 bgcolor=#d6d6d6
| 478140 ||  || — || July 27, 2005 || Siding Spring || SSS || — || align=right | 4.1 km || 
|-id=141 bgcolor=#d6d6d6
| 478141 ||  || — || October 22, 2011 || Kitt Peak || Spacewatch || — || align=right | 2.3 km || 
|-id=142 bgcolor=#d6d6d6
| 478142 ||  || — || September 12, 2005 || Kitt Peak || Spacewatch || — || align=right | 2.5 km || 
|-id=143 bgcolor=#d6d6d6
| 478143 ||  || — || October 29, 2005 || Catalina || CSS || — || align=right | 2.8 km || 
|-id=144 bgcolor=#d6d6d6
| 478144 ||  || — || December 1, 2006 || Mount Lemmon || Mount Lemmon Survey || — || align=right | 2.4 km || 
|-id=145 bgcolor=#d6d6d6
| 478145 ||  || — || October 16, 2006 || Kitt Peak || Spacewatch || — || align=right | 2.7 km || 
|-id=146 bgcolor=#d6d6d6
| 478146 ||  || — || September 26, 2005 || Catalina || CSS || — || align=right | 3.2 km || 
|-id=147 bgcolor=#d6d6d6
| 478147 ||  || — || July 12, 2005 || Mount Lemmon || Mount Lemmon Survey || — || align=right | 3.7 km || 
|-id=148 bgcolor=#d6d6d6
| 478148 ||  || — || August 28, 2005 || Kitt Peak || Spacewatch || — || align=right | 3.1 km || 
|-id=149 bgcolor=#d6d6d6
| 478149 ||  || — || August 30, 2005 || Kitt Peak || Spacewatch || THM || align=right | 2.3 km || 
|-id=150 bgcolor=#d6d6d6
| 478150 ||  || — || October 24, 2011 || Mount Lemmon || Mount Lemmon Survey || — || align=right | 2.7 km || 
|-id=151 bgcolor=#d6d6d6
| 478151 ||  || — || September 27, 2000 || Socorro || LINEAR || — || align=right | 2.6 km || 
|-id=152 bgcolor=#E9E9E9
| 478152 ||  || — || October 18, 2007 || Kitt Peak || Spacewatch || — || align=right | 1.5 km || 
|-id=153 bgcolor=#d6d6d6
| 478153 ||  || — || October 25, 2011 || Kitt Peak || Spacewatch || EOS || align=right | 1.6 km || 
|-id=154 bgcolor=#d6d6d6
| 478154 ||  || — || October 25, 2011 || Kitt Peak || Spacewatch || — || align=right | 2.3 km || 
|-id=155 bgcolor=#d6d6d6
| 478155 ||  || — || September 23, 2011 || Kitt Peak || Spacewatch || — || align=right | 2.5 km || 
|-id=156 bgcolor=#fefefe
| 478156 ||  || — || September 30, 2006 || Mount Lemmon || Mount Lemmon Survey || H || align=right data-sort-value="0.75" | 750 m || 
|-id=157 bgcolor=#d6d6d6
| 478157 ||  || — || October 21, 2011 || Mount Lemmon || Mount Lemmon Survey || — || align=right | 2.9 km || 
|-id=158 bgcolor=#d6d6d6
| 478158 ||  || — || November 6, 1996 || Kitt Peak || Spacewatch || — || align=right | 1.8 km || 
|-id=159 bgcolor=#d6d6d6
| 478159 ||  || — || February 3, 2008 || Kitt Peak || Spacewatch || — || align=right | 3.2 km || 
|-id=160 bgcolor=#E9E9E9
| 478160 ||  || — || November 19, 2007 || Mount Lemmon || Mount Lemmon Survey || — || align=right | 2.4 km || 
|-id=161 bgcolor=#d6d6d6
| 478161 ||  || — || November 14, 2006 || Mount Lemmon || Mount Lemmon Survey || LIX || align=right | 3.3 km || 
|-id=162 bgcolor=#d6d6d6
| 478162 ||  || — || April 10, 2010 || WISE || WISE || LIX || align=right | 3.3 km || 
|-id=163 bgcolor=#d6d6d6
| 478163 ||  || — || October 17, 1995 || Kitt Peak || Spacewatch || — || align=right | 2.5 km || 
|-id=164 bgcolor=#E9E9E9
| 478164 ||  || — || March 26, 2004 || Socorro || LINEAR || — || align=right | 2.8 km || 
|-id=165 bgcolor=#d6d6d6
| 478165 ||  || — || March 27, 2010 || WISE || WISE || critical || align=right | 3.2 km || 
|-id=166 bgcolor=#d6d6d6
| 478166 ||  || — || October 24, 2011 || Kitt Peak || Spacewatch || LIX || align=right | 3.7 km || 
|-id=167 bgcolor=#d6d6d6
| 478167 ||  || — || October 18, 1995 || Kitt Peak || Spacewatch || — || align=right | 2.3 km || 
|-id=168 bgcolor=#d6d6d6
| 478168 ||  || — || October 19, 2011 || Mount Lemmon || Mount Lemmon Survey || — || align=right | 2.0 km || 
|-id=169 bgcolor=#d6d6d6
| 478169 ||  || — || November 18, 2006 || Kitt Peak || Spacewatch || — || align=right | 2.3 km || 
|-id=170 bgcolor=#d6d6d6
| 478170 ||  || — || March 26, 2003 || Kitt Peak || Spacewatch || — || align=right | 3.3 km || 
|-id=171 bgcolor=#d6d6d6
| 478171 ||  || — || September 26, 2005 || Kitt Peak || Spacewatch || — || align=right | 2.8 km || 
|-id=172 bgcolor=#d6d6d6
| 478172 ||  || — || June 9, 2010 || WISE || WISE || — || align=right | 3.4 km || 
|-id=173 bgcolor=#E9E9E9
| 478173 ||  || — || December 10, 2002 || Socorro || LINEAR || — || align=right | 2.5 km || 
|-id=174 bgcolor=#d6d6d6
| 478174 ||  || — || October 19, 2011 || Mount Lemmon || Mount Lemmon Survey || EOS || align=right | 1.9 km || 
|-id=175 bgcolor=#d6d6d6
| 478175 ||  || — || October 20, 2011 || Kitt Peak || Spacewatch || — || align=right | 2.7 km || 
|-id=176 bgcolor=#d6d6d6
| 478176 ||  || — || October 20, 2011 || Kitt Peak || Spacewatch || — || align=right | 2.9 km || 
|-id=177 bgcolor=#fefefe
| 478177 ||  || — || September 23, 2011 || Catalina || CSS || H || align=right data-sort-value="0.91" | 910 m || 
|-id=178 bgcolor=#d6d6d6
| 478178 ||  || — || August 29, 2005 || Kitt Peak || Spacewatch || HYG || align=right | 2.0 km || 
|-id=179 bgcolor=#d6d6d6
| 478179 ||  || — || October 25, 2011 || Kitt Peak || Spacewatch || — || align=right | 2.4 km || 
|-id=180 bgcolor=#d6d6d6
| 478180 ||  || — || September 11, 2005 || Kitt Peak || Spacewatch || THM || align=right | 1.8 km || 
|-id=181 bgcolor=#d6d6d6
| 478181 ||  || — || October 21, 1995 || Kitt Peak || Spacewatch || — || align=right | 2.0 km || 
|-id=182 bgcolor=#d6d6d6
| 478182 ||  || — || April 14, 2010 || WISE || WISE || — || align=right | 3.4 km || 
|-id=183 bgcolor=#d6d6d6
| 478183 ||  || — || October 1, 2011 || Kitt Peak || Spacewatch || — || align=right | 3.3 km || 
|-id=184 bgcolor=#d6d6d6
| 478184 ||  || — || September 21, 2011 || Kitt Peak || Spacewatch || — || align=right | 2.2 km || 
|-id=185 bgcolor=#d6d6d6
| 478185 ||  || — || April 19, 2009 || Mount Lemmon || Mount Lemmon Survey || — || align=right | 2.2 km || 
|-id=186 bgcolor=#d6d6d6
| 478186 ||  || — || November 16, 2006 || Kitt Peak || Spacewatch || — || align=right | 2.5 km || 
|-id=187 bgcolor=#d6d6d6
| 478187 ||  || — || March 19, 2010 || WISE || WISE || — || align=right | 2.9 km || 
|-id=188 bgcolor=#d6d6d6
| 478188 ||  || — || May 28, 2010 || WISE || WISE || — || align=right | 2.9 km || 
|-id=189 bgcolor=#d6d6d6
| 478189 ||  || — || September 27, 2011 || Mount Lemmon || Mount Lemmon Survey || — || align=right | 2.2 km || 
|-id=190 bgcolor=#d6d6d6
| 478190 ||  || — || September 11, 2005 || Kitt Peak || Spacewatch || — || align=right | 1.8 km || 
|-id=191 bgcolor=#d6d6d6
| 478191 ||  || — || March 31, 2008 || Mount Lemmon || Mount Lemmon Survey || — || align=right | 3.1 km || 
|-id=192 bgcolor=#d6d6d6
| 478192 ||  || — || May 21, 2010 || WISE || WISE || — || align=right | 2.8 km || 
|-id=193 bgcolor=#d6d6d6
| 478193 ||  || — || October 18, 2011 || Kitt Peak || Spacewatch || — || align=right | 2.4 km || 
|-id=194 bgcolor=#d6d6d6
| 478194 ||  || — || September 1, 2005 || Kitt Peak || Spacewatch || — || align=right | 2.3 km || 
|-id=195 bgcolor=#d6d6d6
| 478195 ||  || — || May 28, 2009 || Mount Lemmon || Mount Lemmon Survey || — || align=right | 3.3 km || 
|-id=196 bgcolor=#d6d6d6
| 478196 ||  || — || April 21, 2009 || Kitt Peak || Spacewatch || — || align=right | 3.3 km || 
|-id=197 bgcolor=#d6d6d6
| 478197 ||  || — || September 13, 2005 || Kitt Peak || Spacewatch || THM || align=right | 1.8 km || 
|-id=198 bgcolor=#d6d6d6
| 478198 ||  || — || January 24, 2007 || Mount Lemmon || Mount Lemmon Survey || THM || align=right | 2.2 km || 
|-id=199 bgcolor=#d6d6d6
| 478199 ||  || — || May 24, 2010 || WISE || WISE || — || align=right | 3.0 km || 
|-id=200 bgcolor=#d6d6d6
| 478200 ||  || — || December 14, 2006 || Kitt Peak || Spacewatch || — || align=right | 2.1 km || 
|}

478201–478300 

|-bgcolor=#d6d6d6
| 478201 ||  || — || September 24, 2011 || Mount Lemmon || Mount Lemmon Survey || THM || align=right | 2.2 km || 
|-id=202 bgcolor=#d6d6d6
| 478202 ||  || — || October 21, 2011 || Mount Lemmon || Mount Lemmon Survey || EOS || align=right | 2.0 km || 
|-id=203 bgcolor=#d6d6d6
| 478203 ||  || — || November 14, 2006 || Kitt Peak || Spacewatch || — || align=right | 1.4 km || 
|-id=204 bgcolor=#d6d6d6
| 478204 ||  || — || August 30, 2005 || Kitt Peak || Spacewatch || THM || align=right | 1.9 km || 
|-id=205 bgcolor=#d6d6d6
| 478205 ||  || — || October 19, 2006 || Catalina || CSS || — || align=right | 2.4 km || 
|-id=206 bgcolor=#d6d6d6
| 478206 ||  || — || October 1, 2005 || Mount Lemmon || Mount Lemmon Survey || — || align=right | 2.3 km || 
|-id=207 bgcolor=#d6d6d6
| 478207 ||  || — || March 30, 2008 || Catalina || CSS || — || align=right | 3.5 km || 
|-id=208 bgcolor=#d6d6d6
| 478208 ||  || — || October 28, 2011 || Kitt Peak || Spacewatch || — || align=right | 2.9 km || 
|-id=209 bgcolor=#d6d6d6
| 478209 ||  || — || October 20, 2011 || Kitt Peak || Spacewatch || — || align=right | 2.9 km || 
|-id=210 bgcolor=#d6d6d6
| 478210 ||  || — || October 2, 2006 || Kitt Peak || Spacewatch || — || align=right | 2.0 km || 
|-id=211 bgcolor=#d6d6d6
| 478211 ||  || — || November 12, 2006 || Mount Lemmon || Mount Lemmon Survey || — || align=right | 1.9 km || 
|-id=212 bgcolor=#d6d6d6
| 478212 ||  || — || September 30, 2011 || Mount Lemmon || Mount Lemmon Survey || — || align=right | 2.2 km || 
|-id=213 bgcolor=#d6d6d6
| 478213 ||  || — || October 21, 2011 || Kitt Peak || Spacewatch || EOS || align=right | 2.0 km || 
|-id=214 bgcolor=#d6d6d6
| 478214 ||  || — || August 30, 2005 || Kitt Peak || Spacewatch || THM || align=right | 2.1 km || 
|-id=215 bgcolor=#d6d6d6
| 478215 ||  || — || November 14, 2006 || Kitt Peak || Spacewatch || — || align=right | 2.1 km || 
|-id=216 bgcolor=#d6d6d6
| 478216 ||  || — || October 21, 2006 || Mount Lemmon || Mount Lemmon Survey || — || align=right | 2.1 km || 
|-id=217 bgcolor=#d6d6d6
| 478217 ||  || — || November 19, 2006 || Kitt Peak || Spacewatch || — || align=right | 2.2 km || 
|-id=218 bgcolor=#d6d6d6
| 478218 ||  || — || November 16, 2006 || Kitt Peak || Spacewatch || — || align=right | 3.3 km || 
|-id=219 bgcolor=#d6d6d6
| 478219 ||  || — || April 26, 2010 || WISE || WISE || — || align=right | 2.7 km || 
|-id=220 bgcolor=#E9E9E9
| 478220 ||  || — || February 16, 2010 || WISE || WISE || — || align=right | 3.5 km || 
|-id=221 bgcolor=#d6d6d6
| 478221 ||  || — || November 16, 2006 || Kitt Peak || Spacewatch || EOS || align=right | 1.4 km || 
|-id=222 bgcolor=#d6d6d6
| 478222 ||  || — || October 30, 2011 || Kitt Peak || Spacewatch || — || align=right | 3.0 km || 
|-id=223 bgcolor=#d6d6d6
| 478223 ||  || — || October 18, 2011 || Kitt Peak || Spacewatch || — || align=right | 3.1 km || 
|-id=224 bgcolor=#d6d6d6
| 478224 ||  || — || October 30, 2011 || Kitt Peak || Spacewatch || — || align=right | 2.6 km || 
|-id=225 bgcolor=#d6d6d6
| 478225 ||  || — || October 22, 2011 || Kitt Peak || Spacewatch || — || align=right | 2.5 km || 
|-id=226 bgcolor=#d6d6d6
| 478226 ||  || — || May 24, 2010 || WISE || WISE || — || align=right | 2.6 km || 
|-id=227 bgcolor=#d6d6d6
| 478227 ||  || — || November 15, 2006 || Kitt Peak || Spacewatch || THM || align=right | 2.2 km || 
|-id=228 bgcolor=#d6d6d6
| 478228 ||  || — || August 30, 2005 || Kitt Peak || Spacewatch || — || align=right | 2.5 km || 
|-id=229 bgcolor=#d6d6d6
| 478229 ||  || — || March 1, 2008 || Mount Lemmon || Mount Lemmon Survey || — || align=right | 2.3 km || 
|-id=230 bgcolor=#d6d6d6
| 478230 ||  || — || February 28, 2008 || Mount Lemmon || Mount Lemmon Survey || EOS || align=right | 1.6 km || 
|-id=231 bgcolor=#d6d6d6
| 478231 ||  || — || October 13, 2005 || Kitt Peak || Spacewatch || — || align=right | 3.2 km || 
|-id=232 bgcolor=#d6d6d6
| 478232 ||  || — || October 13, 2006 || Kitt Peak || Spacewatch || — || align=right | 2.6 km || 
|-id=233 bgcolor=#E9E9E9
| 478233 ||  || — || September 21, 2011 || Catalina || CSS || — || align=right | 2.8 km || 
|-id=234 bgcolor=#d6d6d6
| 478234 ||  || — || September 21, 2011 || Kitt Peak || Spacewatch || — || align=right | 2.5 km || 
|-id=235 bgcolor=#E9E9E9
| 478235 ||  || — || September 24, 2011 || Mount Lemmon || Mount Lemmon Survey || — || align=right | 2.3 km || 
|-id=236 bgcolor=#d6d6d6
| 478236 ||  || — || September 20, 2011 || Kitt Peak || Spacewatch || EOS || align=right | 1.8 km || 
|-id=237 bgcolor=#E9E9E9
| 478237 ||  || — || September 26, 2011 || Mount Lemmon || Mount Lemmon Survey || — || align=right | 2.1 km || 
|-id=238 bgcolor=#E9E9E9
| 478238 ||  || — || November 19, 2007 || Kitt Peak || Spacewatch || — || align=right | 1.8 km || 
|-id=239 bgcolor=#d6d6d6
| 478239 ||  || — || April 15, 2010 || WISE || WISE || URS || align=right | 3.2 km || 
|-id=240 bgcolor=#d6d6d6
| 478240 ||  || — || October 18, 2011 || Kitt Peak || Spacewatch || — || align=right | 3.2 km || 
|-id=241 bgcolor=#d6d6d6
| 478241 ||  || — || April 27, 2009 || Mount Lemmon || Mount Lemmon Survey || EOS || align=right | 2.2 km || 
|-id=242 bgcolor=#d6d6d6
| 478242 ||  || — || March 1, 2008 || Catalina || CSS || — || align=right | 3.6 km || 
|-id=243 bgcolor=#E9E9E9
| 478243 ||  || — || October 19, 2011 || Mount Lemmon || Mount Lemmon Survey || — || align=right | 2.3 km || 
|-id=244 bgcolor=#d6d6d6
| 478244 ||  || — || October 19, 2011 || Mount Lemmon || Mount Lemmon Survey || THM || align=right | 1.9 km || 
|-id=245 bgcolor=#d6d6d6
| 478245 ||  || — || July 3, 2005 || Mount Lemmon || Mount Lemmon Survey || — || align=right | 2.0 km || 
|-id=246 bgcolor=#d6d6d6
| 478246 ||  || — || May 1, 2003 || Kitt Peak || Spacewatch || — || align=right | 2.6 km || 
|-id=247 bgcolor=#d6d6d6
| 478247 ||  || — || October 20, 2006 || Kitt Peak || Spacewatch || — || align=right | 3.1 km || 
|-id=248 bgcolor=#d6d6d6
| 478248 ||  || — || September 21, 2011 || Kitt Peak || Spacewatch || — || align=right | 1.7 km || 
|-id=249 bgcolor=#d6d6d6
| 478249 ||  || — || January 13, 2002 || Kitt Peak || Spacewatch || — || align=right | 2.0 km || 
|-id=250 bgcolor=#d6d6d6
| 478250 ||  || — || September 19, 1995 || Kitt Peak || Spacewatch || — || align=right | 1.7 km || 
|-id=251 bgcolor=#d6d6d6
| 478251 ||  || — || September 20, 2011 || Kitt Peak || Spacewatch || EOS || align=right | 1.5 km || 
|-id=252 bgcolor=#d6d6d6
| 478252 ||  || — || November 17, 2006 || Kitt Peak || Spacewatch || — || align=right | 2.6 km || 
|-id=253 bgcolor=#d6d6d6
| 478253 ||  || — || September 29, 1994 || Kitt Peak || Spacewatch || critical || align=right | 1.7 km || 
|-id=254 bgcolor=#d6d6d6
| 478254 ||  || — || October 27, 2006 || Mount Lemmon || Mount Lemmon Survey || — || align=right | 2.4 km || 
|-id=255 bgcolor=#d6d6d6
| 478255 ||  || — || October 23, 2011 || Kitt Peak || Spacewatch || — || align=right | 3.1 km || 
|-id=256 bgcolor=#d6d6d6
| 478256 ||  || — || September 27, 2000 || Kitt Peak || Spacewatch || — || align=right | 2.3 km || 
|-id=257 bgcolor=#d6d6d6
| 478257 ||  || — || April 3, 2008 || Kitt Peak || Spacewatch || — || align=right | 2.8 km || 
|-id=258 bgcolor=#d6d6d6
| 478258 ||  || — || October 22, 2006 || Mount Lemmon || Mount Lemmon Survey || HYG || align=right | 2.6 km || 
|-id=259 bgcolor=#d6d6d6
| 478259 ||  || — || January 9, 2002 || Kitt Peak || Spacewatch || — || align=right | 3.1 km || 
|-id=260 bgcolor=#d6d6d6
| 478260 ||  || — || May 4, 2010 || WISE || WISE || — || align=right | 4.0 km || 
|-id=261 bgcolor=#d6d6d6
| 478261 ||  || — || March 11, 2008 || Kitt Peak || Spacewatch || — || align=right | 2.4 km || 
|-id=262 bgcolor=#d6d6d6
| 478262 ||  || — || October 21, 2011 || Kitt Peak || Spacewatch || — || align=right | 2.1 km || 
|-id=263 bgcolor=#d6d6d6
| 478263 ||  || — || April 22, 2009 || Mount Lemmon || Mount Lemmon Survey || — || align=right | 2.7 km || 
|-id=264 bgcolor=#d6d6d6
| 478264 ||  || — || October 24, 2011 || Kitt Peak || Spacewatch || — || align=right | 2.0 km || 
|-id=265 bgcolor=#d6d6d6
| 478265 ||  || — || October 1, 2005 || Catalina || CSS || — || align=right | 2.9 km || 
|-id=266 bgcolor=#fefefe
| 478266 ||  || — || October 22, 2011 || Mount Lemmon || Mount Lemmon Survey || H || align=right | 1.0 km || 
|-id=267 bgcolor=#d6d6d6
| 478267 ||  || — || September 21, 2011 || Kitt Peak || Spacewatch || — || align=right | 2.8 km || 
|-id=268 bgcolor=#d6d6d6
| 478268 ||  || — || September 17, 2006 || Catalina || CSS || — || align=right | 3.4 km || 
|-id=269 bgcolor=#d6d6d6
| 478269 ||  || — || August 21, 2006 || Kitt Peak || Spacewatch || — || align=right | 1.9 km || 
|-id=270 bgcolor=#d6d6d6
| 478270 ||  || — || October 20, 2011 || Kitt Peak || Spacewatch || — || align=right | 3.1 km || 
|-id=271 bgcolor=#fefefe
| 478271 ||  || — || October 24, 2011 || Catalina || CSS || H || align=right data-sort-value="0.98" | 980 m || 
|-id=272 bgcolor=#d6d6d6
| 478272 ||  || — || November 2, 2011 || Mount Lemmon || Mount Lemmon Survey || — || align=right | 3.0 km || 
|-id=273 bgcolor=#d6d6d6
| 478273 ||  || — || October 23, 2005 || Catalina || CSS || — || align=right | 4.0 km || 
|-id=274 bgcolor=#d6d6d6
| 478274 ||  || — || November 17, 2006 || Mount Lemmon || Mount Lemmon Survey || — || align=right | 2.3 km || 
|-id=275 bgcolor=#d6d6d6
| 478275 ||  || — || June 17, 2004 || Kitt Peak || Spacewatch || — || align=right | 3.1 km || 
|-id=276 bgcolor=#d6d6d6
| 478276 ||  || — || October 27, 2006 || Mount Lemmon || Mount Lemmon Survey || — || align=right | 1.8 km || 
|-id=277 bgcolor=#d6d6d6
| 478277 ||  || — || September 28, 2006 || Mount Lemmon || Mount Lemmon Survey || — || align=right | 2.6 km || 
|-id=278 bgcolor=#d6d6d6
| 478278 ||  || — || December 12, 2006 || Mount Lemmon || Mount Lemmon Survey || — || align=right | 1.6 km || 
|-id=279 bgcolor=#d6d6d6
| 478279 ||  || — || February 28, 2008 || Mount Lemmon || Mount Lemmon Survey || — || align=right | 2.5 km || 
|-id=280 bgcolor=#d6d6d6
| 478280 ||  || — || September 12, 2005 || Kitt Peak || Spacewatch || THM || align=right | 1.8 km || 
|-id=281 bgcolor=#d6d6d6
| 478281 ||  || — || March 18, 2009 || Kitt Peak || Spacewatch || — || align=right | 2.4 km || 
|-id=282 bgcolor=#d6d6d6
| 478282 ||  || — || September 13, 2005 || Kitt Peak || Spacewatch || — || align=right | 2.6 km || 
|-id=283 bgcolor=#d6d6d6
| 478283 ||  || — || September 20, 2011 || Kitt Peak || Spacewatch || EOS || align=right | 2.1 km || 
|-id=284 bgcolor=#d6d6d6
| 478284 ||  || — || November 1, 2011 || Catalina || CSS || — || align=right | 3.6 km || 
|-id=285 bgcolor=#d6d6d6
| 478285 ||  || — || March 27, 2008 || Mount Lemmon || Mount Lemmon Survey || — || align=right | 2.1 km || 
|-id=286 bgcolor=#d6d6d6
| 478286 ||  || — || August 29, 2005 || Kitt Peak || Spacewatch || — || align=right | 2.4 km || 
|-id=287 bgcolor=#d6d6d6
| 478287 ||  || — || November 24, 2006 || Mount Lemmon || Mount Lemmon Survey || KOR || align=right | 1.3 km || 
|-id=288 bgcolor=#d6d6d6
| 478288 ||  || — || May 31, 2010 || WISE || WISE || — || align=right | 3.9 km || 
|-id=289 bgcolor=#d6d6d6
| 478289 ||  || — || May 20, 2010 || WISE || WISE || — || align=right | 3.1 km || 
|-id=290 bgcolor=#d6d6d6
| 478290 ||  || — || October 21, 2006 || Mount Lemmon || Mount Lemmon Survey || — || align=right | 2.2 km || 
|-id=291 bgcolor=#d6d6d6
| 478291 ||  || — || September 2, 2010 || Mount Lemmon || Mount Lemmon Survey || TEL || align=right | 1.2 km || 
|-id=292 bgcolor=#d6d6d6
| 478292 ||  || — || October 28, 2011 || Mount Lemmon || Mount Lemmon Survey || — || align=right | 3.2 km || 
|-id=293 bgcolor=#d6d6d6
| 478293 ||  || — || November 21, 2006 || Mount Lemmon || Mount Lemmon Survey || — || align=right | 2.4 km || 
|-id=294 bgcolor=#d6d6d6
| 478294 ||  || — || April 19, 2010 || WISE || WISE || — || align=right | 2.7 km || 
|-id=295 bgcolor=#d6d6d6
| 478295 ||  || — || October 23, 2011 || Kitt Peak || Spacewatch || — || align=right | 2.3 km || 
|-id=296 bgcolor=#d6d6d6
| 478296 ||  || — || November 17, 2011 || Mount Lemmon || Mount Lemmon Survey || EMA || align=right | 3.1 km || 
|-id=297 bgcolor=#d6d6d6
| 478297 ||  || — || April 16, 2010 || WISE || WISE || LIX || align=right | 3.0 km || 
|-id=298 bgcolor=#d6d6d6
| 478298 ||  || — || October 21, 2011 || Mount Lemmon || Mount Lemmon Survey || — || align=right | 2.0 km || 
|-id=299 bgcolor=#d6d6d6
| 478299 ||  || — || November 22, 2006 || Mount Lemmon || Mount Lemmon Survey || — || align=right | 2.6 km || 
|-id=300 bgcolor=#d6d6d6
| 478300 ||  || — || November 15, 2006 || Kitt Peak || Spacewatch || — || align=right | 2.1 km || 
|}

478301–478400 

|-bgcolor=#d6d6d6
| 478301 ||  || — || September 10, 2000 || Anderson Mesa || LONEOS || — || align=right | 3.3 km || 
|-id=302 bgcolor=#d6d6d6
| 478302 ||  || — || May 14, 2010 || WISE || WISE || — || align=right | 3.9 km || 
|-id=303 bgcolor=#d6d6d6
| 478303 ||  || — || April 24, 2003 || Kitt Peak || Spacewatch || — || align=right | 3.1 km || 
|-id=304 bgcolor=#d6d6d6
| 478304 ||  || — || November 18, 2006 || Mount Lemmon || Mount Lemmon Survey || — || align=right | 2.3 km || 
|-id=305 bgcolor=#d6d6d6
| 478305 ||  || — || November 17, 1995 || Kitt Peak || Spacewatch || — || align=right | 2.0 km || 
|-id=306 bgcolor=#d6d6d6
| 478306 ||  || — || November 30, 2000 || Socorro || LINEAR || — || align=right | 4.0 km || 
|-id=307 bgcolor=#d6d6d6
| 478307 ||  || — || November 4, 2005 || Catalina || CSS || — || align=right | 2.9 km || 
|-id=308 bgcolor=#d6d6d6
| 478308 ||  || — || September 29, 2005 || Mount Lemmon || Mount Lemmon Survey || — || align=right | 2.7 km || 
|-id=309 bgcolor=#d6d6d6
| 478309 ||  || — || April 15, 2010 || WISE || WISE || LIX || align=right | 3.2 km || 
|-id=310 bgcolor=#d6d6d6
| 478310 ||  || — || November 15, 1995 || Kitt Peak || Spacewatch || — || align=right | 2.6 km || 
|-id=311 bgcolor=#d6d6d6
| 478311 ||  || — || November 1, 2011 || Mount Lemmon || Mount Lemmon Survey || EOS || align=right | 2.1 km || 
|-id=312 bgcolor=#d6d6d6
| 478312 ||  || — || December 24, 2006 || Kitt Peak || Spacewatch || VER || align=right | 2.6 km || 
|-id=313 bgcolor=#d6d6d6
| 478313 ||  || — || November 12, 2006 || Mount Lemmon || Mount Lemmon Survey || — || align=right | 2.7 km || 
|-id=314 bgcolor=#d6d6d6
| 478314 ||  || — || October 19, 2011 || Kitt Peak || Spacewatch || — || align=right | 3.4 km || 
|-id=315 bgcolor=#d6d6d6
| 478315 ||  || — || December 14, 2006 || Kitt Peak || Spacewatch || — || align=right | 2.2 km || 
|-id=316 bgcolor=#d6d6d6
| 478316 ||  || — || September 24, 2011 || Mount Lemmon || Mount Lemmon Survey || — || align=right | 2.5 km || 
|-id=317 bgcolor=#d6d6d6
| 478317 ||  || — || September 29, 2005 || Mount Lemmon || Mount Lemmon Survey || THM || align=right | 1.7 km || 
|-id=318 bgcolor=#d6d6d6
| 478318 ||  || — || October 30, 2011 || Kitt Peak || Spacewatch || — || align=right | 2.8 km || 
|-id=319 bgcolor=#d6d6d6
| 478319 ||  || — || May 28, 2009 || Mount Lemmon || Mount Lemmon Survey || — || align=right | 3.6 km || 
|-id=320 bgcolor=#d6d6d6
| 478320 ||  || — || November 27, 2006 || Kitt Peak || Spacewatch || — || align=right | 1.8 km || 
|-id=321 bgcolor=#d6d6d6
| 478321 ||  || — || March 13, 2007 || Catalina || CSS || — || align=right | 3.7 km || 
|-id=322 bgcolor=#d6d6d6
| 478322 ||  || — || November 26, 2011 || Kitt Peak || Spacewatch || EOS || align=right | 1.9 km || 
|-id=323 bgcolor=#d6d6d6
| 478323 ||  || — || May 31, 2010 || WISE || WISE || — || align=right | 3.1 km || 
|-id=324 bgcolor=#d6d6d6
| 478324 ||  || — || November 18, 2011 || Kitt Peak || Spacewatch || — || align=right | 3.9 km || 
|-id=325 bgcolor=#d6d6d6
| 478325 ||  || — || December 12, 2006 || Mount Lemmon || Mount Lemmon Survey || THM || align=right | 1.8 km || 
|-id=326 bgcolor=#d6d6d6
| 478326 ||  || — || October 31, 2011 || Kitt Peak || Spacewatch || — || align=right | 2.5 km || 
|-id=327 bgcolor=#d6d6d6
| 478327 ||  || — || February 28, 2008 || Kitt Peak || Spacewatch || — || align=right | 2.9 km || 
|-id=328 bgcolor=#d6d6d6
| 478328 ||  || — || February 28, 2008 || Kitt Peak || Spacewatch || EOS || align=right | 1.5 km || 
|-id=329 bgcolor=#d6d6d6
| 478329 ||  || — || November 3, 2011 || Mount Lemmon || Mount Lemmon Survey || — || align=right | 2.3 km || 
|-id=330 bgcolor=#d6d6d6
| 478330 ||  || — || November 3, 2011 || Mount Lemmon || Mount Lemmon Survey || — || align=right | 3.5 km || 
|-id=331 bgcolor=#d6d6d6
| 478331 ||  || — || October 30, 2011 || Kitt Peak || Spacewatch || — || align=right | 2.9 km || 
|-id=332 bgcolor=#d6d6d6
| 478332 ||  || — || October 29, 2005 || Kitt Peak || Spacewatch || — || align=right | 2.6 km || 
|-id=333 bgcolor=#d6d6d6
| 478333 ||  || — || October 31, 2005 || Kitt Peak || Spacewatch || — || align=right | 4.5 km || 
|-id=334 bgcolor=#d6d6d6
| 478334 ||  || — || November 16, 2011 || Mount Lemmon || Mount Lemmon Survey || — || align=right | 2.8 km || 
|-id=335 bgcolor=#d6d6d6
| 478335 ||  || — || December 1, 2006 || Mount Lemmon || Mount Lemmon Survey || — || align=right | 2.4 km || 
|-id=336 bgcolor=#d6d6d6
| 478336 ||  || — || November 19, 2006 || Catalina || CSS || — || align=right | 2.6 km || 
|-id=337 bgcolor=#d6d6d6
| 478337 ||  || — || October 27, 2005 || Kitt Peak || Spacewatch || — || align=right | 3.0 km || 
|-id=338 bgcolor=#d6d6d6
| 478338 ||  || — || October 21, 2011 || Mount Lemmon || Mount Lemmon Survey || — || align=right | 2.3 km || 
|-id=339 bgcolor=#d6d6d6
| 478339 ||  || — || September 1, 2010 || Mount Lemmon || Mount Lemmon Survey || — || align=right | 3.5 km || 
|-id=340 bgcolor=#d6d6d6
| 478340 ||  || — || November 23, 2011 || Catalina || CSS || — || align=right | 3.4 km || 
|-id=341 bgcolor=#d6d6d6
| 478341 ||  || — || June 2, 2010 || WISE || WISE || — || align=right | 4.5 km || 
|-id=342 bgcolor=#d6d6d6
| 478342 ||  || — || November 17, 2011 || Mount Lemmon || Mount Lemmon Survey || — || align=right | 3.7 km || 
|-id=343 bgcolor=#d6d6d6
| 478343 ||  || — || April 11, 2008 || Kitt Peak || Spacewatch || — || align=right | 2.9 km || 
|-id=344 bgcolor=#d6d6d6
| 478344 ||  || — || May 28, 2010 || WISE || WISE || — || align=right | 4.0 km || 
|-id=345 bgcolor=#d6d6d6
| 478345 ||  || — || March 1, 2008 || Kitt Peak || Spacewatch || — || align=right | 2.2 km || 
|-id=346 bgcolor=#d6d6d6
| 478346 ||  || — || September 11, 2005 || Kitt Peak || Spacewatch || EOS || align=right | 1.8 km || 
|-id=347 bgcolor=#d6d6d6
| 478347 ||  || — || October 28, 2011 || Mount Lemmon || Mount Lemmon Survey || — || align=right | 2.6 km || 
|-id=348 bgcolor=#d6d6d6
| 478348 ||  || — || May 9, 2010 || WISE || WISE || — || align=right | 2.5 km || 
|-id=349 bgcolor=#d6d6d6
| 478349 ||  || — || October 21, 2011 || Mount Lemmon || Mount Lemmon Survey || EOS || align=right | 1.8 km || 
|-id=350 bgcolor=#d6d6d6
| 478350 ||  || — || June 9, 2010 || WISE || WISE || — || align=right | 3.8 km || 
|-id=351 bgcolor=#d6d6d6
| 478351 ||  || — || September 30, 2005 || Mount Lemmon || Mount Lemmon Survey || THM || align=right | 1.8 km || 
|-id=352 bgcolor=#d6d6d6
| 478352 ||  || — || November 24, 2006 || Mount Lemmon || Mount Lemmon Survey || — || align=right | 2.3 km || 
|-id=353 bgcolor=#E9E9E9
| 478353 ||  || — || December 13, 2007 || Socorro || LINEAR || — || align=right | 2.0 km || 
|-id=354 bgcolor=#d6d6d6
| 478354 ||  || — || February 12, 2008 || Mount Lemmon || Mount Lemmon Survey || — || align=right | 3.4 km || 
|-id=355 bgcolor=#d6d6d6
| 478355 ||  || — || March 2, 2008 || Mount Lemmon || Mount Lemmon Survey || — || align=right | 3.7 km || 
|-id=356 bgcolor=#fefefe
| 478356 ||  || — || October 31, 2011 || Mount Lemmon || Mount Lemmon Survey || H || align=right data-sort-value="0.65" | 650 m || 
|-id=357 bgcolor=#d6d6d6
| 478357 ||  || — || April 5, 2008 || Mount Lemmon || Mount Lemmon Survey || — || align=right | 3.0 km || 
|-id=358 bgcolor=#d6d6d6
| 478358 ||  || — || June 19, 2010 || Kitt Peak || Spacewatch || — || align=right | 4.9 km || 
|-id=359 bgcolor=#d6d6d6
| 478359 ||  || — || November 25, 2005 || Catalina || CSS || LIX || align=right | 3.7 km || 
|-id=360 bgcolor=#d6d6d6
| 478360 ||  || — || October 27, 2005 || Mount Lemmon || Mount Lemmon Survey || — || align=right | 3.3 km || 
|-id=361 bgcolor=#d6d6d6
| 478361 ||  || — || November 28, 2011 || Mount Lemmon || Mount Lemmon Survey || TIR || align=right | 3.1 km || 
|-id=362 bgcolor=#d6d6d6
| 478362 ||  || — || October 22, 2011 || Mount Lemmon || Mount Lemmon Survey || — || align=right | 3.2 km || 
|-id=363 bgcolor=#d6d6d6
| 478363 ||  || — || March 14, 2007 || Anderson Mesa || LONEOS || — || align=right | 2.6 km || 
|-id=364 bgcolor=#d6d6d6
| 478364 ||  || — || December 31, 1994 || Kitt Peak || Spacewatch || — || align=right | 2.7 km || 
|-id=365 bgcolor=#d6d6d6
| 478365 ||  || — || December 25, 2011 || Kitt Peak || Spacewatch || TIR || align=right | 2.9 km || 
|-id=366 bgcolor=#d6d6d6
| 478366 ||  || — || January 10, 2007 || Mount Lemmon || Mount Lemmon Survey || — || align=right | 3.5 km || 
|-id=367 bgcolor=#d6d6d6
| 478367 ||  || — || September 15, 2010 || Kitt Peak || Spacewatch || — || align=right | 2.3 km || 
|-id=368 bgcolor=#fefefe
| 478368 ||  || — || December 26, 2011 || Kitt Peak || Spacewatch || H || align=right data-sort-value="0.86" | 860 m || 
|-id=369 bgcolor=#d6d6d6
| 478369 ||  || — || December 27, 2011 || Kitt Peak || Spacewatch || — || align=right | 2.9 km || 
|-id=370 bgcolor=#fefefe
| 478370 ||  || — || December 29, 2011 || Mount Lemmon || Mount Lemmon Survey || Hcritical || align=right data-sort-value="0.43" | 430 m || 
|-id=371 bgcolor=#d6d6d6
| 478371 ||  || — || October 9, 2005 || Kitt Peak || Spacewatch || — || align=right | 2.0 km || 
|-id=372 bgcolor=#d6d6d6
| 478372 ||  || — || December 5, 2005 || Kitt Peak || Spacewatch || — || align=right | 2.7 km || 
|-id=373 bgcolor=#d6d6d6
| 478373 ||  || — || December 29, 2005 || Kitt Peak || Spacewatch || — || align=right | 2.8 km || 
|-id=374 bgcolor=#d6d6d6
| 478374 ||  || — || October 31, 2005 || Anderson Mesa || LONEOS || — || align=right | 3.5 km || 
|-id=375 bgcolor=#fefefe
| 478375 ||  || — || December 27, 2011 || Catalina || CSS || H || align=right data-sort-value="0.58" | 580 m || 
|-id=376 bgcolor=#d6d6d6
| 478376 ||  || — || November 27, 2011 || Mount Lemmon || Mount Lemmon Survey || — || align=right | 2.7 km || 
|-id=377 bgcolor=#d6d6d6
| 478377 ||  || — || December 22, 2005 || Catalina || CSS || Tj (2.97) || align=right | 4.8 km || 
|-id=378 bgcolor=#fefefe
| 478378 ||  || — || August 30, 2005 || Kitt Peak || Spacewatch || H || align=right data-sort-value="0.84" | 840 m || 
|-id=379 bgcolor=#d6d6d6
| 478379 ||  || — || December 14, 2006 || Catalina || CSS || — || align=right | 2.7 km || 
|-id=380 bgcolor=#fefefe
| 478380 ||  || — || February 13, 2004 || Kitt Peak || Spacewatch || H || align=right data-sort-value="0.55" | 550 m || 
|-id=381 bgcolor=#d6d6d6
| 478381 ||  || — || March 14, 2007 || Kitt Peak || Spacewatch || — || align=right | 3.1 km || 
|-id=382 bgcolor=#fefefe
| 478382 ||  || — || January 1, 2012 || Catalina || CSS || H || align=right data-sort-value="0.91" | 910 m || 
|-id=383 bgcolor=#d6d6d6
| 478383 ||  || — || November 30, 2005 || Mount Lemmon || Mount Lemmon Survey || — || align=right | 4.4 km || 
|-id=384 bgcolor=#d6d6d6
| 478384 ||  || — || July 16, 2010 || WISE || WISE || — || align=right | 4.0 km || 
|-id=385 bgcolor=#FA8072
| 478385 ||  || — || August 29, 1995 || Kitt Peak || Spacewatch || — || align=right data-sort-value="0.42" | 420 m || 
|-id=386 bgcolor=#d6d6d6
| 478386 ||  || — || November 1, 2005 || Mount Lemmon || Mount Lemmon Survey || — || align=right | 2.1 km || 
|-id=387 bgcolor=#d6d6d6
| 478387 ||  || — || August 31, 2005 || Kitt Peak || Spacewatch || — || align=right | 1.8 km || 
|-id=388 bgcolor=#d6d6d6
| 478388 ||  || — || December 25, 2005 || Mount Lemmon || Mount Lemmon Survey || — || align=right | 3.0 km || 
|-id=389 bgcolor=#fefefe
| 478389 ||  || — || January 18, 2012 || Catalina || CSS || H || align=right data-sort-value="0.56" | 560 m || 
|-id=390 bgcolor=#d6d6d6
| 478390 ||  || — || December 24, 2011 || Mount Lemmon || Mount Lemmon Survey || — || align=right | 3.7 km || 
|-id=391 bgcolor=#d6d6d6
| 478391 ||  || — || August 8, 2010 || WISE || WISE || — || align=right | 5.4 km || 
|-id=392 bgcolor=#fefefe
| 478392 ||  || — || December 31, 2011 || Kitt Peak || Spacewatch || H || align=right data-sort-value="0.68" | 680 m || 
|-id=393 bgcolor=#d6d6d6
| 478393 ||  || — || August 6, 2010 || WISE || WISE || 7:4 || align=right | 4.4 km || 
|-id=394 bgcolor=#d6d6d6
| 478394 ||  || — || September 17, 2010 || Mount Lemmon || Mount Lemmon Survey || HYG || align=right | 2.5 km || 
|-id=395 bgcolor=#d6d6d6
| 478395 ||  || — || July 6, 2010 || WISE || WISE || — || align=right | 3.0 km || 
|-id=396 bgcolor=#d6d6d6
| 478396 ||  || — || July 15, 2010 || WISE || WISE || Tj (2.97) || align=right | 3.3 km || 
|-id=397 bgcolor=#d6d6d6
| 478397 ||  || — || December 3, 1999 || Kitt Peak || Spacewatch || — || align=right | 3.3 km || 
|-id=398 bgcolor=#d6d6d6
| 478398 ||  || — || October 6, 2005 || Kitt Peak || Spacewatch || Tj (2.97) || align=right | 2.6 km || 
|-id=399 bgcolor=#fefefe
| 478399 ||  || — || January 30, 2012 || Mount Lemmon || Mount Lemmon Survey || H || align=right data-sort-value="0.74" | 740 m || 
|-id=400 bgcolor=#d6d6d6
| 478400 ||  || — || July 26, 2010 || WISE || WISE || (1118) || align=right | 3.6 km || 
|}

478401–478500 

|-bgcolor=#fefefe
| 478401 ||  || — || January 18, 2012 || Kitt Peak || Spacewatch || H || align=right data-sort-value="0.68" | 680 m || 
|-id=402 bgcolor=#d6d6d6
| 478402 ||  || — || July 22, 2010 || WISE || WISE || LIX || align=right | 4.2 km || 
|-id=403 bgcolor=#d6d6d6
| 478403 ||  || — || July 15, 2010 || WISE || WISE || — || align=right | 3.5 km || 
|-id=404 bgcolor=#d6d6d6
| 478404 ||  || — || November 12, 1999 || Socorro || LINEAR || Tj (2.99) || align=right | 4.0 km || 
|-id=405 bgcolor=#fefefe
| 478405 ||  || — || January 19, 2012 || Kitt Peak || Spacewatch || H || align=right data-sort-value="0.42" | 420 m || 
|-id=406 bgcolor=#d6d6d6
| 478406 ||  || — || November 22, 2000 || Kitt Peak || Spacewatch || — || align=right | 2.8 km || 
|-id=407 bgcolor=#fefefe
| 478407 ||  || — || January 29, 2012 || Kitt Peak || Spacewatch || H || align=right data-sort-value="0.87" | 870 m || 
|-id=408 bgcolor=#d6d6d6
| 478408 ||  || — || April 26, 2007 || Mount Lemmon || Mount Lemmon Survey || — || align=right | 3.2 km || 
|-id=409 bgcolor=#d6d6d6
| 478409 ||  || — || September 11, 2010 || Kitt Peak || Spacewatch || — || align=right | 2.5 km || 
|-id=410 bgcolor=#d6d6d6
| 478410 ||  || — || October 11, 2010 || Mount Lemmon || Mount Lemmon Survey || — || align=right | 2.5 km || 
|-id=411 bgcolor=#fefefe
| 478411 ||  || — || January 2, 2012 || Catalina || CSS || H || align=right data-sort-value="0.70" | 700 m || 
|-id=412 bgcolor=#d6d6d6
| 478412 ||  || — || December 6, 2005 || Kitt Peak || Spacewatch || — || align=right | 3.2 km || 
|-id=413 bgcolor=#d6d6d6
| 478413 ||  || — || November 1, 2011 || Mount Lemmon || Mount Lemmon Survey || 7:4 || align=right | 4.4 km || 
|-id=414 bgcolor=#d6d6d6
| 478414 ||  || — || December 17, 2000 || Socorro || LINEAR || — || align=right | 3.0 km || 
|-id=415 bgcolor=#d6d6d6
| 478415 ||  || — || February 3, 2012 || Mount Lemmon || Mount Lemmon Survey || — || align=right | 3.2 km || 
|-id=416 bgcolor=#d6d6d6
| 478416 ||  || — || March 25, 2007 || Mount Lemmon || Mount Lemmon Survey || — || align=right | 3.2 km || 
|-id=417 bgcolor=#fefefe
| 478417 ||  || — || February 23, 2012 || Kitt Peak || Spacewatch || — || align=right data-sort-value="0.62" | 620 m || 
|-id=418 bgcolor=#fefefe
| 478418 ||  || — || January 29, 2009 || Mount Lemmon || Mount Lemmon Survey || — || align=right data-sort-value="0.71" | 710 m || 
|-id=419 bgcolor=#fefefe
| 478419 ||  || — || April 18, 2009 || Kitt Peak || Spacewatch || — || align=right data-sort-value="0.59" | 590 m || 
|-id=420 bgcolor=#fefefe
| 478420 ||  || — || March 27, 2012 || Kitt Peak || Spacewatch || — || align=right data-sort-value="0.62" | 620 m || 
|-id=421 bgcolor=#fefefe
| 478421 ||  || — || October 28, 2010 || Mount Lemmon || Mount Lemmon Survey || — || align=right data-sort-value="0.57" | 570 m || 
|-id=422 bgcolor=#FA8072
| 478422 ||  || — || June 16, 2009 || Mount Lemmon || Mount Lemmon Survey || — || align=right data-sort-value="0.71" | 710 m || 
|-id=423 bgcolor=#fefefe
| 478423 ||  || — || March 23, 2012 || Kitt Peak || Spacewatch || — || align=right data-sort-value="0.62" | 620 m || 
|-id=424 bgcolor=#fefefe
| 478424 ||  || — || February 24, 2012 || Catalina || CSS || H || align=right data-sort-value="0.85" | 850 m || 
|-id=425 bgcolor=#fefefe
| 478425 ||  || — || March 31, 2012 || Mount Lemmon || Mount Lemmon Survey || — || align=right data-sort-value="0.72" | 720 m || 
|-id=426 bgcolor=#fefefe
| 478426 ||  || — || March 28, 2012 || Kitt Peak || Spacewatch || — || align=right data-sort-value="0.67" | 670 m || 
|-id=427 bgcolor=#fefefe
| 478427 ||  || — || April 20, 2012 || Mount Lemmon || Mount Lemmon Survey || — || align=right data-sort-value="0.66" | 660 m || 
|-id=428 bgcolor=#fefefe
| 478428 ||  || — || April 1, 2012 || Kitt Peak || Spacewatch || — || align=right data-sort-value="0.64" | 640 m || 
|-id=429 bgcolor=#FA8072
| 478429 ||  || — || October 17, 2009 || Mount Lemmon || Mount Lemmon Survey || — || align=right data-sort-value="0.62" | 620 m || 
|-id=430 bgcolor=#fefefe
| 478430 ||  || — || March 14, 2007 || Mount Lemmon || Mount Lemmon Survey || H || align=right data-sort-value="0.81" | 810 m || 
|-id=431 bgcolor=#fefefe
| 478431 ||  || — || April 19, 2012 || Kitt Peak || Spacewatch || — || align=right data-sort-value="0.62" | 620 m || 
|-id=432 bgcolor=#fefefe
| 478432 ||  || — || March 24, 2012 || Kitt Peak || Spacewatch || — || align=right data-sort-value="0.94" | 940 m || 
|-id=433 bgcolor=#fefefe
| 478433 ||  || — || March 17, 2005 || Kitt Peak || Spacewatch || — || align=right data-sort-value="0.63" | 630 m || 
|-id=434 bgcolor=#fefefe
| 478434 ||  || — || April 17, 2012 || Kitt Peak || Spacewatch || — || align=right data-sort-value="0.79" | 790 m || 
|-id=435 bgcolor=#fefefe
| 478435 ||  || — || April 21, 2012 || Kitt Peak || Spacewatch || — || align=right data-sort-value="0.78" | 780 m || 
|-id=436 bgcolor=#fefefe
| 478436 ||  || — || September 15, 2009 || Kitt Peak || Spacewatch || — || align=right data-sort-value="0.68" | 680 m || 
|-id=437 bgcolor=#fefefe
| 478437 ||  || — || March 27, 2012 || Kitt Peak || Spacewatch || — || align=right data-sort-value="0.62" | 620 m || 
|-id=438 bgcolor=#fefefe
| 478438 ||  || — || April 11, 2005 || Mount Lemmon || Mount Lemmon Survey || — || align=right data-sort-value="0.62" | 620 m || 
|-id=439 bgcolor=#fefefe
| 478439 ||  || — || May 30, 2006 || Mount Lemmon || Mount Lemmon Survey || — || align=right data-sort-value="0.58" | 580 m || 
|-id=440 bgcolor=#fefefe
| 478440 ||  || — || April 9, 2005 || Kitt Peak || Spacewatch || — || align=right data-sort-value="0.75" | 750 m || 
|-id=441 bgcolor=#fefefe
| 478441 ||  || — || April 20, 2012 || Kitt Peak || Spacewatch || — || align=right data-sort-value="0.67" | 670 m || 
|-id=442 bgcolor=#fefefe
| 478442 ||  || — || April 16, 2012 || Kitt Peak || Spacewatch || — || align=right data-sort-value="0.62" | 620 m || 
|-id=443 bgcolor=#fefefe
| 478443 ||  || — || June 17, 2009 || Mount Lemmon || Mount Lemmon Survey || — || align=right data-sort-value="0.81" | 810 m || 
|-id=444 bgcolor=#fefefe
| 478444 ||  || — || January 10, 2008 || Mount Lemmon || Mount Lemmon Survey || — || align=right data-sort-value="0.64" | 640 m || 
|-id=445 bgcolor=#fefefe
| 478445 ||  || — || September 23, 2009 || Mount Lemmon || Mount Lemmon Survey || — || align=right data-sort-value="0.59" | 590 m || 
|-id=446 bgcolor=#fefefe
| 478446 ||  || — || April 23, 2012 || Kitt Peak || Spacewatch || — || align=right data-sort-value="0.71" | 710 m || 
|-id=447 bgcolor=#fefefe
| 478447 ||  || — || June 23, 2009 || Mount Lemmon || Mount Lemmon Survey || — || align=right data-sort-value="0.57" | 570 m || 
|-id=448 bgcolor=#fefefe
| 478448 ||  || — || September 16, 2009 || Kitt Peak || Spacewatch || — || align=right data-sort-value="0.64" | 640 m || 
|-id=449 bgcolor=#fefefe
| 478449 ||  || — || May 21, 2005 || Mount Lemmon || Mount Lemmon Survey || — || align=right data-sort-value="0.66" | 660 m || 
|-id=450 bgcolor=#FA8072
| 478450 ||  || — || May 19, 2012 || Siding Spring || SSS || — || align=right | 1.0 km || 
|-id=451 bgcolor=#fefefe
| 478451 ||  || — || November 11, 2009 || Mount Lemmon || Mount Lemmon Survey || — || align=right data-sort-value="0.71" | 710 m || 
|-id=452 bgcolor=#fefefe
| 478452 ||  || — || September 22, 2009 || Mount Lemmon || Mount Lemmon Survey || — || align=right data-sort-value="0.71" | 710 m || 
|-id=453 bgcolor=#fefefe
| 478453 ||  || — || June 10, 2012 || Siding Spring || SSS || — || align=right | 1.2 km || 
|-id=454 bgcolor=#fefefe
| 478454 ||  || — || July 28, 2009 || Kitt Peak || Spacewatch || — || align=right data-sort-value="0.58" | 580 m || 
|-id=455 bgcolor=#fefefe
| 478455 ||  || — || July 15, 2012 || Siding Spring || SSS || — || align=right | 1.1 km || 
|-id=456 bgcolor=#fefefe
| 478456 ||  || — || September 23, 2005 || Catalina || CSS || V || align=right data-sort-value="0.59" | 590 m || 
|-id=457 bgcolor=#fefefe
| 478457 ||  || — || June 23, 2012 || Mount Lemmon || Mount Lemmon Survey || NYS || align=right data-sort-value="0.74" | 740 m || 
|-id=458 bgcolor=#fefefe
| 478458 ||  || — || August 10, 2012 || Kitt Peak || Spacewatch || — || align=right data-sort-value="0.80" | 800 m || 
|-id=459 bgcolor=#fefefe
| 478459 ||  || — || May 28, 2012 || Mount Lemmon || Mount Lemmon Survey || — || align=right data-sort-value="0.86" | 860 m || 
|-id=460 bgcolor=#fefefe
| 478460 ||  || — || February 26, 2011 || Mount Lemmon || Mount Lemmon Survey || — || align=right data-sort-value="0.88" | 880 m || 
|-id=461 bgcolor=#fefefe
| 478461 ||  || — || October 17, 2009 || Mount Lemmon || Mount Lemmon Survey || V || align=right data-sort-value="0.60" | 600 m || 
|-id=462 bgcolor=#fefefe
| 478462 ||  || — || January 28, 2011 || Mount Lemmon || Mount Lemmon Survey || — || align=right data-sort-value="0.74" | 740 m || 
|-id=463 bgcolor=#fefefe
| 478463 ||  || — || November 17, 1995 || Kitt Peak || Spacewatch || — || align=right data-sort-value="0.75" | 750 m || 
|-id=464 bgcolor=#E9E9E9
| 478464 ||  || — || February 20, 2006 || Mount Lemmon || Mount Lemmon Survey || — || align=right data-sort-value="0.94" | 940 m || 
|-id=465 bgcolor=#FA8072
| 478465 ||  || — || May 15, 2008 || Mount Lemmon || Mount Lemmon Survey || — || align=right | 1.1 km || 
|-id=466 bgcolor=#E9E9E9
| 478466 ||  || — || April 24, 2011 || Mount Lemmon || Mount Lemmon Survey || — || align=right data-sort-value="0.81" | 810 m || 
|-id=467 bgcolor=#fefefe
| 478467 ||  || — || September 19, 2001 || Socorro || LINEAR || — || align=right data-sort-value="0.75" | 750 m || 
|-id=468 bgcolor=#fefefe
| 478468 ||  || — || November 25, 2005 || Kitt Peak || Spacewatch || critical || align=right data-sort-value="0.78" | 780 m || 
|-id=469 bgcolor=#E9E9E9
| 478469 ||  || — || September 5, 2008 || Kitt Peak || Spacewatch || — || align=right data-sort-value="0.68" | 680 m || 
|-id=470 bgcolor=#fefefe
| 478470 ||  || — || November 6, 2005 || Kitt Peak || Spacewatch || — || align=right data-sort-value="0.77" | 770 m || 
|-id=471 bgcolor=#fefefe
| 478471 ||  || — || September 19, 2001 || Socorro || LINEAR || V || align=right data-sort-value="0.62" | 620 m || 
|-id=472 bgcolor=#E9E9E9
| 478472 ||  || — || August 14, 2012 || Kitt Peak || Spacewatch || MAR || align=right | 1.00 km || 
|-id=473 bgcolor=#E9E9E9
| 478473 ||  || — || August 24, 2012 || Kitt Peak || Spacewatch || — || align=right | 1.3 km || 
|-id=474 bgcolor=#fefefe
| 478474 ||  || — || September 4, 2008 || Kitt Peak || Spacewatch || — || align=right data-sort-value="0.84" | 840 m || 
|-id=475 bgcolor=#E9E9E9
| 478475 ||  || — || March 10, 2002 || Kitt Peak || Spacewatch || — || align=right | 1.4 km || 
|-id=476 bgcolor=#fefefe
| 478476 ||  || — || April 14, 2007 || Kitt Peak || Spacewatch || — || align=right data-sort-value="0.85" | 850 m || 
|-id=477 bgcolor=#fefefe
| 478477 ||  || — || July 29, 2008 || Kitt Peak || Spacewatch || — || align=right data-sort-value="0.88" | 880 m || 
|-id=478 bgcolor=#fefefe
| 478478 ||  || — || April 22, 2007 || Kitt Peak || Spacewatch || — || align=right | 1.0 km || 
|-id=479 bgcolor=#fefefe
| 478479 ||  || — || December 19, 2009 || Mount Lemmon || Mount Lemmon Survey || — || align=right data-sort-value="0.92" | 920 m || 
|-id=480 bgcolor=#fefefe
| 478480 ||  || — || April 8, 2003 || Kitt Peak || Spacewatch || — || align=right data-sort-value="0.96" | 960 m || 
|-id=481 bgcolor=#fefefe
| 478481 ||  || — || February 25, 2011 || Mount Lemmon || Mount Lemmon Survey || — || align=right | 1.0 km || 
|-id=482 bgcolor=#E9E9E9
| 478482 ||  || — || September 4, 2008 || Kitt Peak || Spacewatch || — || align=right | 1.2 km || 
|-id=483 bgcolor=#fefefe
| 478483 ||  || — || August 25, 2001 || Kitt Peak || Spacewatch || MAScritical || align=right data-sort-value="0.62" | 620 m || 
|-id=484 bgcolor=#fefefe
| 478484 ||  || — || January 5, 2006 || Kitt Peak || Spacewatch || — || align=right | 1.3 km || 
|-id=485 bgcolor=#fefefe
| 478485 ||  || — || January 24, 2011 || Mount Lemmon || Mount Lemmon Survey || — || align=right | 1.0 km || 
|-id=486 bgcolor=#E9E9E9
| 478486 ||  || — || September 20, 2008 || Catalina || CSS || — || align=right data-sort-value="0.81" | 810 m || 
|-id=487 bgcolor=#E9E9E9
| 478487 ||  || — || September 24, 2008 || Kitt Peak || Spacewatch || — || align=right data-sort-value="0.70" | 700 m || 
|-id=488 bgcolor=#fefefe
| 478488 ||  || — || August 7, 2008 || Kitt Peak || Spacewatch || — || align=right data-sort-value="0.61" | 610 m || 
|-id=489 bgcolor=#E9E9E9
| 478489 ||  || — || September 23, 2008 || Kitt Peak || Spacewatch || — || align=right | 1.2 km || 
|-id=490 bgcolor=#fefefe
| 478490 ||  || — || January 27, 2006 || Kitt Peak || Spacewatch || — || align=right data-sort-value="0.70" | 700 m || 
|-id=491 bgcolor=#fefefe
| 478491 ||  || — || November 10, 2005 || Mount Lemmon || Mount Lemmon Survey || — || align=right data-sort-value="0.94" | 940 m || 
|-id=492 bgcolor=#E9E9E9
| 478492 ||  || — || August 23, 2008 || Kitt Peak || Spacewatch || — || align=right data-sort-value="0.74" | 740 m || 
|-id=493 bgcolor=#fefefe
| 478493 ||  || — || September 15, 2012 || Catalina || CSS || — || align=right | 1.1 km || 
|-id=494 bgcolor=#E9E9E9
| 478494 ||  || — || September 3, 2008 || Kitt Peak || Spacewatch || — || align=right data-sort-value="0.74" | 740 m || 
|-id=495 bgcolor=#E9E9E9
| 478495 ||  || — || September 23, 2008 || Kitt Peak || Spacewatch || — || align=right data-sort-value="0.97" | 970 m || 
|-id=496 bgcolor=#fefefe
| 478496 ||  || — || December 30, 2005 || Kitt Peak || Spacewatch || — || align=right | 1.0 km || 
|-id=497 bgcolor=#E9E9E9
| 478497 ||  || — || November 3, 2008 || Mount Lemmon || Mount Lemmon Survey || — || align=right data-sort-value="0.95" | 950 m || 
|-id=498 bgcolor=#fefefe
| 478498 ||  || — || September 7, 2008 || Catalina || CSS || — || align=right | 1.0 km || 
|-id=499 bgcolor=#fefefe
| 478499 ||  || — || June 23, 2012 || Mount Lemmon || Mount Lemmon Survey || NYS || align=right data-sort-value="0.65" | 650 m || 
|-id=500 bgcolor=#fefefe
| 478500 ||  || — || November 12, 2001 || Socorro || LINEAR || NYS || align=right data-sort-value="0.69" | 690 m || 
|}

478501–478600 

|-bgcolor=#fefefe
| 478501 ||  || — || December 5, 2005 || Mount Lemmon || Mount Lemmon Survey || — || align=right data-sort-value="0.74" | 740 m || 
|-id=502 bgcolor=#E9E9E9
| 478502 ||  || — || October 4, 2004 || Kitt Peak || Spacewatch || — || align=right data-sort-value="0.81" | 810 m || 
|-id=503 bgcolor=#E9E9E9
| 478503 ||  || — || December 1, 2008 || Mount Lemmon || Mount Lemmon Survey || — || align=right | 1.3 km || 
|-id=504 bgcolor=#fefefe
| 478504 ||  || — || September 18, 2001 || Kitt Peak || Spacewatch || — || align=right data-sort-value="0.71" | 710 m || 
|-id=505 bgcolor=#E9E9E9
| 478505 ||  || — || September 3, 2008 || Kitt Peak || Spacewatch || — || align=right | 1.1 km || 
|-id=506 bgcolor=#fefefe
| 478506 ||  || — || September 17, 2012 || Kitt Peak || Spacewatch || — || align=right data-sort-value="0.69" | 690 m || 
|-id=507 bgcolor=#fefefe
| 478507 ||  || — || September 18, 2012 || Kitt Peak || Spacewatch || NYS || align=right data-sort-value="0.66" | 660 m || 
|-id=508 bgcolor=#fefefe
| 478508 ||  || — || April 2, 2011 || Mount Lemmon || Mount Lemmon Survey || — || align=right data-sort-value="0.93" | 930 m || 
|-id=509 bgcolor=#fefefe
| 478509 ||  || — || September 17, 2012 || Mount Lemmon || Mount Lemmon Survey || — || align=right data-sort-value="0.71" | 710 m || 
|-id=510 bgcolor=#fefefe
| 478510 ||  || — || October 22, 2005 || Kitt Peak || Spacewatch || — || align=right data-sort-value="0.73" | 730 m || 
|-id=511 bgcolor=#E9E9E9
| 478511 ||  || — || September 16, 2012 || Kitt Peak || Spacewatch || — || align=right | 1.5 km || 
|-id=512 bgcolor=#E9E9E9
| 478512 ||  || — || April 2, 2006 || Kitt Peak || Spacewatch || — || align=right | 1.8 km || 
|-id=513 bgcolor=#fefefe
| 478513 ||  || — || March 4, 2011 || Kitt Peak || Spacewatch || — || align=right data-sort-value="0.86" | 860 m || 
|-id=514 bgcolor=#fefefe
| 478514 ||  || — || September 7, 2008 || Mount Lemmon || Mount Lemmon Survey || NYS || align=right data-sort-value="0.59" | 590 m || 
|-id=515 bgcolor=#fefefe
| 478515 ||  || — || September 7, 2008 || Mount Lemmon || Mount Lemmon Survey || fast? || align=right data-sort-value="0.72" | 720 m || 
|-id=516 bgcolor=#fefefe
| 478516 ||  || — || July 30, 2008 || Kitt Peak || Spacewatch || MAS || align=right data-sort-value="0.77" | 770 m || 
|-id=517 bgcolor=#fefefe
| 478517 ||  || — || September 21, 2012 || Kitt Peak || Spacewatch || — || align=right data-sort-value="0.89" | 890 m || 
|-id=518 bgcolor=#E9E9E9
| 478518 ||  || — || September 19, 2012 || Mount Lemmon || Mount Lemmon Survey || — || align=right | 1.6 km || 
|-id=519 bgcolor=#E9E9E9
| 478519 ||  || — || October 26, 2008 || Mount Lemmon || Mount Lemmon Survey || — || align=right | 1.00 km || 
|-id=520 bgcolor=#E9E9E9
| 478520 ||  || — || September 17, 2012 || Kitt Peak || Spacewatch || — || align=right | 1.8 km || 
|-id=521 bgcolor=#E9E9E9
| 478521 ||  || — || September 25, 2012 || Mount Lemmon || Mount Lemmon Survey || MIS || align=right | 2.6 km || 
|-id=522 bgcolor=#E9E9E9
| 478522 ||  || — || September 15, 2012 || Kitt Peak || Spacewatch || — || align=right | 1.7 km || 
|-id=523 bgcolor=#E9E9E9
| 478523 ||  || — || September 21, 2012 || Kitt Peak || Spacewatch || — || align=right | 1.6 km || 
|-id=524 bgcolor=#E9E9E9
| 478524 ||  || — || September 16, 2012 || Kitt Peak || Spacewatch || EUN || align=right | 1.3 km || 
|-id=525 bgcolor=#E9E9E9
| 478525 ||  || — || September 30, 2008 || Mount Lemmon || Mount Lemmon Survey || — || align=right | 1.9 km || 
|-id=526 bgcolor=#fefefe
| 478526 ||  || — || July 29, 2008 || Kitt Peak || Spacewatch || MAS || align=right data-sort-value="0.63" | 630 m || 
|-id=527 bgcolor=#E9E9E9
| 478527 ||  || — || September 21, 2008 || Kitt Peak || Spacewatch || — || align=right | 1.2 km || 
|-id=528 bgcolor=#E9E9E9
| 478528 ||  || — || October 23, 2008 || Kitt Peak || Spacewatch || — || align=right | 1.2 km || 
|-id=529 bgcolor=#fefefe
| 478529 ||  || — || September 7, 2008 || Mount Lemmon || Mount Lemmon Survey || NYS || align=right data-sort-value="0.68" | 680 m || 
|-id=530 bgcolor=#fefefe
| 478530 ||  || — || September 6, 2008 || Catalina || CSS || — || align=right data-sort-value="0.83" | 830 m || 
|-id=531 bgcolor=#fefefe
| 478531 ||  || — || September 16, 2012 || Kitt Peak || Spacewatch || — || align=right | 1.1 km || 
|-id=532 bgcolor=#E9E9E9
| 478532 ||  || — || June 10, 2011 || Mount Lemmon || Mount Lemmon Survey || — || align=right | 1.3 km || 
|-id=533 bgcolor=#E9E9E9
| 478533 ||  || — || September 24, 2008 || Mount Lemmon || Mount Lemmon Survey || — || align=right | 1.4 km || 
|-id=534 bgcolor=#E9E9E9
| 478534 ||  || — || September 14, 2012 || Catalina || CSS || — || align=right | 2.2 km || 
|-id=535 bgcolor=#E9E9E9
| 478535 ||  || — || May 13, 2010 || Mount Lemmon || Mount Lemmon Survey || — || align=right | 1.8 km || 
|-id=536 bgcolor=#E9E9E9
| 478536 ||  || — || October 7, 2008 || Kitt Peak || Spacewatch || — || align=right data-sort-value="0.57" | 570 m || 
|-id=537 bgcolor=#E9E9E9
| 478537 ||  || — || March 24, 2006 || Mount Lemmon || Mount Lemmon Survey || — || align=right | 1.8 km || 
|-id=538 bgcolor=#E9E9E9
| 478538 ||  || — || December 27, 2003 || Socorro || LINEAR || — || align=right | 2.6 km || 
|-id=539 bgcolor=#fefefe
| 478539 ||  || — || April 19, 2007 || Kitt Peak || Spacewatch || — || align=right | 1.0 km || 
|-id=540 bgcolor=#E9E9E9
| 478540 ||  || — || October 21, 2008 || Kitt Peak || Spacewatch || (5) || align=right data-sort-value="0.76" | 760 m || 
|-id=541 bgcolor=#fefefe
| 478541 ||  || — || September 7, 2008 || Mount Lemmon || Mount Lemmon Survey || NYS || align=right data-sort-value="0.61" | 610 m || 
|-id=542 bgcolor=#fefefe
| 478542 ||  || — || April 6, 2010 || WISE || WISE || — || align=right | 1.5 km || 
|-id=543 bgcolor=#E9E9E9
| 478543 ||  || — || September 16, 2003 || Kitt Peak || Spacewatch || — || align=right | 2.1 km || 
|-id=544 bgcolor=#fefefe
| 478544 ||  || — || September 4, 2008 || Kitt Peak || Spacewatch || — || align=right data-sort-value="0.72" | 720 m || 
|-id=545 bgcolor=#E9E9E9
| 478545 ||  || — || October 4, 2012 || Mount Lemmon || Mount Lemmon Survey || — || align=right | 1.3 km || 
|-id=546 bgcolor=#fefefe
| 478546 ||  || — || August 6, 2008 || Siding Spring || SSS || — || align=right data-sort-value="0.98" | 980 m || 
|-id=547 bgcolor=#E9E9E9
| 478547 ||  || — || September 22, 2008 || Kitt Peak || Spacewatch || — || align=right data-sort-value="0.85" | 850 m || 
|-id=548 bgcolor=#E9E9E9
| 478548 ||  || — || December 12, 2004 || Kitt Peak || Spacewatch || — || align=right | 1.2 km || 
|-id=549 bgcolor=#E9E9E9
| 478549 ||  || — || September 25, 2008 || Kitt Peak || Spacewatch || MAR || align=right data-sort-value="0.86" | 860 m || 
|-id=550 bgcolor=#E9E9E9
| 478550 ||  || — || February 4, 2005 || Kitt Peak || Spacewatch || — || align=right | 1.3 km || 
|-id=551 bgcolor=#E9E9E9
| 478551 ||  || — || February 17, 2010 || Kitt Peak || Spacewatch || WIT || align=right data-sort-value="0.75" | 750 m || 
|-id=552 bgcolor=#E9E9E9
| 478552 ||  || — || October 24, 2008 || Kitt Peak || Spacewatch || — || align=right | 1.2 km || 
|-id=553 bgcolor=#fefefe
| 478553 ||  || — || September 20, 2008 || Mount Lemmon || Mount Lemmon Survey || — || align=right data-sort-value="0.97" | 970 m || 
|-id=554 bgcolor=#E9E9E9
| 478554 ||  || — || October 7, 2004 || Kitt Peak || Spacewatch || critical || align=right data-sort-value="0.34" | 340 m || 
|-id=555 bgcolor=#E9E9E9
| 478555 ||  || — || September 14, 2012 || Catalina || CSS || MAR || align=right | 1.4 km || 
|-id=556 bgcolor=#E9E9E9
| 478556 ||  || — || September 24, 2012 || Kitt Peak || Spacewatch || — || align=right | 1.8 km || 
|-id=557 bgcolor=#fefefe
| 478557 ||  || — || August 14, 2004 || Campo Imperatore || CINEOS || — || align=right data-sort-value="0.65" | 650 m || 
|-id=558 bgcolor=#fefefe
| 478558 ||  || — || December 24, 2005 || Kitt Peak || Spacewatch || — || align=right data-sort-value="0.80" | 800 m || 
|-id=559 bgcolor=#E9E9E9
| 478559 ||  || — || October 6, 2012 || Kitt Peak || Spacewatch || — || align=right | 1.7 km || 
|-id=560 bgcolor=#E9E9E9
| 478560 ||  || — || November 11, 2004 || Kitt Peak || Spacewatch || — || align=right | 1.1 km || 
|-id=561 bgcolor=#E9E9E9
| 478561 ||  || — || April 24, 2006 || Mount Lemmon || Mount Lemmon Survey || — || align=right | 2.0 km || 
|-id=562 bgcolor=#fefefe
| 478562 ||  || — || October 8, 2012 || Mount Lemmon || Mount Lemmon Survey || — || align=right data-sort-value="0.93" | 930 m || 
|-id=563 bgcolor=#E9E9E9
| 478563 ||  || — || September 24, 2008 || Kitt Peak || Spacewatch || — || align=right data-sort-value="0.79" | 790 m || 
|-id=564 bgcolor=#E9E9E9
| 478564 ||  || — || August 28, 2012 || Mount Lemmon || Mount Lemmon Survey || MAR || align=right data-sort-value="0.87" | 870 m || 
|-id=565 bgcolor=#E9E9E9
| 478565 ||  || — || October 2, 2003 || Kitt Peak || Spacewatch || — || align=right | 1.9 km || 
|-id=566 bgcolor=#E9E9E9
| 478566 ||  || — || October 25, 2008 || Kitt Peak || Spacewatch || — || align=right data-sort-value="0.86" | 860 m || 
|-id=567 bgcolor=#E9E9E9
| 478567 ||  || — || October 8, 2012 || Mount Lemmon || Mount Lemmon Survey || — || align=right | 1.8 km || 
|-id=568 bgcolor=#E9E9E9
| 478568 ||  || — || August 28, 2012 || Mount Lemmon || Mount Lemmon Survey || — || align=right | 1.1 km || 
|-id=569 bgcolor=#E9E9E9
| 478569 ||  || — || September 22, 1995 || Kitt Peak || Spacewatch || — || align=right data-sort-value="0.95" | 950 m || 
|-id=570 bgcolor=#E9E9E9
| 478570 ||  || — || April 18, 2007 || Kitt Peak || Spacewatch || — || align=right data-sort-value="0.75" | 750 m || 
|-id=571 bgcolor=#E9E9E9
| 478571 ||  || — || October 9, 2008 || Kitt Peak || Spacewatch || (5) || align=right data-sort-value="0.69" | 690 m || 
|-id=572 bgcolor=#E9E9E9
| 478572 ||  || — || October 29, 2008 || Kitt Peak || Spacewatch || — || align=right | 1.3 km || 
|-id=573 bgcolor=#E9E9E9
| 478573 ||  || — || April 30, 2006 || Kitt Peak || Spacewatch || — || align=right | 1.2 km || 
|-id=574 bgcolor=#FFC2E0
| 478574 ||  || — || October 8, 2012 || Mount Lemmon || Mount Lemmon Survey || APOPHA || align=right data-sort-value="0.71" | 710 m || 
|-id=575 bgcolor=#C2FFFF
| 478575 ||  || — || May 7, 2010 || WISE || WISE || L5 || align=right | 7.1 km || 
|-id=576 bgcolor=#fefefe
| 478576 ||  || — || March 6, 2011 || Mount Lemmon || Mount Lemmon Survey || — || align=right data-sort-value="0.68" | 680 m || 
|-id=577 bgcolor=#E9E9E9
| 478577 ||  || — || March 28, 2011 || Kitt Peak || Spacewatch || — || align=right | 1.0 km || 
|-id=578 bgcolor=#E9E9E9
| 478578 ||  || — || September 12, 2007 || Mount Lemmon || Mount Lemmon Survey || — || align=right | 2.1 km || 
|-id=579 bgcolor=#fefefe
| 478579 ||  || — || May 23, 2011 || Mount Lemmon || Mount Lemmon Survey || — || align=right data-sort-value="0.98" | 980 m || 
|-id=580 bgcolor=#E9E9E9
| 478580 ||  || — || March 28, 2011 || Mount Lemmon || Mount Lemmon Survey || — || align=right | 1.1 km || 
|-id=581 bgcolor=#E9E9E9
| 478581 ||  || — || September 3, 2008 || Kitt Peak || Spacewatch || — || align=right data-sort-value="0.75" | 750 m || 
|-id=582 bgcolor=#E9E9E9
| 478582 ||  || — || February 27, 2006 || Kitt Peak || Spacewatch || — || align=right data-sort-value="0.80" | 800 m || 
|-id=583 bgcolor=#E9E9E9
| 478583 ||  || — || October 8, 2012 || Kitt Peak || Spacewatch || — || align=right | 1.2 km || 
|-id=584 bgcolor=#fefefe
| 478584 ||  || — || August 24, 2008 || Kitt Peak || Spacewatch || — || align=right data-sort-value="0.77" | 770 m || 
|-id=585 bgcolor=#E9E9E9
| 478585 ||  || — || September 19, 2003 || Kitt Peak || Spacewatch || — || align=right | 1.8 km || 
|-id=586 bgcolor=#fefefe
| 478586 ||  || — || June 4, 2011 || Mount Lemmon || Mount Lemmon Survey || — || align=right | 1.1 km || 
|-id=587 bgcolor=#fefefe
| 478587 ||  || — || January 12, 2010 || Kitt Peak || Spacewatch || — || align=right data-sort-value="0.93" | 930 m || 
|-id=588 bgcolor=#E9E9E9
| 478588 ||  || — || October 8, 2008 || Mount Lemmon || Mount Lemmon Survey || RAF || align=right data-sort-value="0.78" | 780 m || 
|-id=589 bgcolor=#E9E9E9
| 478589 ||  || — || October 9, 2008 || Mount Lemmon || Mount Lemmon Survey || — || align=right | 1.6 km || 
|-id=590 bgcolor=#E9E9E9
| 478590 ||  || — || October 10, 2008 || Mount Lemmon || Mount Lemmon Survey || RAF || align=right data-sort-value="0.80" | 800 m || 
|-id=591 bgcolor=#E9E9E9
| 478591 ||  || — || January 23, 2006 || Mount Lemmon || Mount Lemmon Survey || — || align=right | 1.0 km || 
|-id=592 bgcolor=#E9E9E9
| 478592 ||  || — || September 25, 2012 || Kitt Peak || Spacewatch || — || align=right | 1.6 km || 
|-id=593 bgcolor=#fefefe
| 478593 ||  || — || December 5, 2005 || Mount Lemmon || Mount Lemmon Survey || V || align=right data-sort-value="0.74" | 740 m || 
|-id=594 bgcolor=#E9E9E9
| 478594 ||  || — || October 10, 2012 || Mount Lemmon || Mount Lemmon Survey || — || align=right | 1.2 km || 
|-id=595 bgcolor=#E9E9E9
| 478595 ||  || — || November 18, 2008 || Kitt Peak || Spacewatch || WIT || align=right data-sort-value="0.86" | 860 m || 
|-id=596 bgcolor=#E9E9E9
| 478596 ||  || — || October 2, 1999 || Kitt Peak || Spacewatch || — || align=right | 1.3 km || 
|-id=597 bgcolor=#fefefe
| 478597 ||  || — || September 23, 2005 || Kitt Peak || Spacewatch || — || align=right | 2.2 km || 
|-id=598 bgcolor=#E9E9E9
| 478598 ||  || — || November 2, 2008 || Mount Lemmon || Mount Lemmon Survey || — || align=right | 1.1 km || 
|-id=599 bgcolor=#fefefe
| 478599 ||  || — || December 5, 2005 || Kitt Peak || Spacewatch || NYS || align=right data-sort-value="0.78" | 780 m || 
|-id=600 bgcolor=#E9E9E9
| 478600 ||  || — || September 16, 2012 || Catalina || CSS || — || align=right | 1.5 km || 
|}

478601–478700 

|-bgcolor=#E9E9E9
| 478601 ||  || — || September 15, 2012 || Mount Lemmon || Mount Lemmon Survey || — || align=right | 2.9 km || 
|-id=602 bgcolor=#E9E9E9
| 478602 ||  || — || October 10, 2012 || Mount Lemmon || Mount Lemmon Survey || JUN || align=right | 1.1 km || 
|-id=603 bgcolor=#E9E9E9
| 478603 ||  || — || February 4, 2006 || Mount Lemmon || Mount Lemmon Survey || — || align=right data-sort-value="0.78" | 780 m || 
|-id=604 bgcolor=#fefefe
| 478604 ||  || — || June 23, 2012 || Mount Lemmon || Mount Lemmon Survey || — || align=right data-sort-value="0.79" | 790 m || 
|-id=605 bgcolor=#E9E9E9
| 478605 ||  || — || October 27, 2008 || Kitt Peak || Spacewatch || — || align=right | 1.3 km || 
|-id=606 bgcolor=#fefefe
| 478606 ||  || — || July 29, 2008 || Kitt Peak || Spacewatch || — || align=right data-sort-value="0.73" | 730 m || 
|-id=607 bgcolor=#E9E9E9
| 478607 ||  || — || May 2, 2006 || Mount Lemmon || Mount Lemmon Survey || — || align=right | 1.3 km || 
|-id=608 bgcolor=#E9E9E9
| 478608 ||  || — || October 10, 2012 || Mount Lemmon || Mount Lemmon Survey || EUN || align=right | 1.4 km || 
|-id=609 bgcolor=#E9E9E9
| 478609 ||  || — || October 8, 2012 || Mount Lemmon || Mount Lemmon Survey || — || align=right | 1.1 km || 
|-id=610 bgcolor=#E9E9E9
| 478610 ||  || — || September 11, 2007 || Mount Lemmon || Mount Lemmon Survey || AGN || align=right | 1.1 km || 
|-id=611 bgcolor=#E9E9E9
| 478611 ||  || — || December 1, 2008 || Kitt Peak || Spacewatch || — || align=right | 1.4 km || 
|-id=612 bgcolor=#E9E9E9
| 478612 ||  || — || September 14, 2012 || Mount Lemmon || Mount Lemmon Survey || — || align=right | 1.0 km || 
|-id=613 bgcolor=#E9E9E9
| 478613 ||  || — || September 17, 2004 || Kitt Peak || Spacewatch || — || align=right data-sort-value="0.71" | 710 m || 
|-id=614 bgcolor=#E9E9E9
| 478614 ||  || — || October 22, 2003 || Kitt Peak || Spacewatch || AGN || align=right data-sort-value="0.96" | 960 m || 
|-id=615 bgcolor=#E9E9E9
| 478615 ||  || — || August 30, 2003 || Kitt Peak || Spacewatch || — || align=right | 1.2 km || 
|-id=616 bgcolor=#fefefe
| 478616 ||  || — || September 15, 2012 || Kitt Peak || Spacewatch || V || align=right data-sort-value="0.83" | 830 m || 
|-id=617 bgcolor=#E9E9E9
| 478617 ||  || — || September 27, 2008 || Mount Lemmon || Mount Lemmon Survey || — || align=right | 1.3 km || 
|-id=618 bgcolor=#E9E9E9
| 478618 ||  || — || April 12, 2010 || Mount Lemmon || Mount Lemmon Survey || MAR || align=right | 1.2 km || 
|-id=619 bgcolor=#E9E9E9
| 478619 ||  || — || September 15, 2012 || Kitt Peak || Spacewatch || — || align=right | 1.6 km || 
|-id=620 bgcolor=#E9E9E9
| 478620 ||  || — || October 23, 2008 || Kitt Peak || Spacewatch || — || align=right data-sort-value="0.71" | 710 m || 
|-id=621 bgcolor=#E9E9E9
| 478621 ||  || — || October 5, 2012 || Kitt Peak || Spacewatch || — || align=right data-sort-value="0.99" | 990 m || 
|-id=622 bgcolor=#E9E9E9
| 478622 ||  || — || October 28, 2008 || Mount Lemmon || Mount Lemmon Survey || KON || align=right | 1.7 km || 
|-id=623 bgcolor=#fefefe
| 478623 ||  || — || November 6, 2005 || Mount Lemmon || Mount Lemmon Survey || CLA || align=right | 1.7 km || 
|-id=624 bgcolor=#E9E9E9
| 478624 ||  || — || October 9, 2012 || Mount Lemmon || Mount Lemmon Survey || — || align=right | 1.2 km || 
|-id=625 bgcolor=#fefefe
| 478625 ||  || — || April 18, 2007 || Mount Lemmon || Mount Lemmon Survey || — || align=right data-sort-value="0.73" | 730 m || 
|-id=626 bgcolor=#E9E9E9
| 478626 ||  || — || September 20, 1995 || Kitt Peak || Spacewatch || — || align=right | 1.2 km || 
|-id=627 bgcolor=#E9E9E9
| 478627 ||  || — || October 5, 2004 || Kitt Peak || Spacewatch || — || align=right data-sort-value="0.82" | 820 m || 
|-id=628 bgcolor=#E9E9E9
| 478628 ||  || — || October 17, 2003 || Kitt Peak || Spacewatch || — || align=right | 1.6 km || 
|-id=629 bgcolor=#E9E9E9
| 478629 ||  || — || June 5, 2011 || Mount Lemmon || Mount Lemmon Survey || — || align=right | 1.5 km || 
|-id=630 bgcolor=#E9E9E9
| 478630 ||  || — || December 2, 2008 || Kitt Peak || Spacewatch || — || align=right | 1.0 km || 
|-id=631 bgcolor=#E9E9E9
| 478631 ||  || — || September 27, 2008 || Mount Lemmon || Mount Lemmon Survey || — || align=right data-sort-value="0.85" | 850 m || 
|-id=632 bgcolor=#E9E9E9
| 478632 ||  || — || September 25, 2008 || Kitt Peak || Spacewatch || MAR || align=right data-sort-value="0.84" | 840 m || 
|-id=633 bgcolor=#E9E9E9
| 478633 ||  || — || October 21, 2003 || Kitt Peak || Spacewatch || — || align=right | 1.5 km || 
|-id=634 bgcolor=#E9E9E9
| 478634 ||  || — || October 1, 2003 || Kitt Peak || Spacewatch || — || align=right | 2.3 km || 
|-id=635 bgcolor=#E9E9E9
| 478635 ||  || — || October 4, 2008 || Mount Lemmon || Mount Lemmon Survey || (5) || align=right data-sort-value="0.78" | 780 m || 
|-id=636 bgcolor=#E9E9E9
| 478636 ||  || — || October 24, 2008 || Catalina || CSS || — || align=right data-sort-value="0.89" | 890 m || 
|-id=637 bgcolor=#E9E9E9
| 478637 ||  || — || September 11, 2007 || Kitt Peak || Spacewatch || — || align=right | 1.9 km || 
|-id=638 bgcolor=#E9E9E9
| 478638 ||  || — || October 10, 2012 || Kitt Peak || Spacewatch || — || align=right data-sort-value="0.77" | 770 m || 
|-id=639 bgcolor=#E9E9E9
| 478639 ||  || — || April 8, 2010 || Mount Lemmon || Mount Lemmon Survey || — || align=right | 1.4 km || 
|-id=640 bgcolor=#E9E9E9
| 478640 ||  || — || April 23, 2007 || Kitt Peak || Spacewatch || — || align=right data-sort-value="0.92" | 920 m || 
|-id=641 bgcolor=#E9E9E9
| 478641 ||  || — || November 9, 1999 || Socorro || LINEAR || — || align=right | 1.4 km || 
|-id=642 bgcolor=#E9E9E9
| 478642 ||  || — || September 11, 2007 || Mount Lemmon || Mount Lemmon Survey || — || align=right | 1.9 km || 
|-id=643 bgcolor=#E9E9E9
| 478643 ||  || — || February 19, 2010 || Mount Lemmon || Mount Lemmon Survey || — || align=right | 1.5 km || 
|-id=644 bgcolor=#E9E9E9
| 478644 ||  || — || July 30, 2008 || Mount Lemmon || Mount Lemmon Survey || (5) || align=right data-sort-value="0.86" | 860 m || 
|-id=645 bgcolor=#E9E9E9
| 478645 ||  || — || October 7, 2008 || Mount Lemmon || Mount Lemmon Survey || — || align=right | 1.2 km || 
|-id=646 bgcolor=#E9E9E9
| 478646 ||  || — || October 12, 1999 || Socorro || LINEAR || — || align=right | 1.8 km || 
|-id=647 bgcolor=#E9E9E9
| 478647 ||  || — || December 2, 2008 || Kitt Peak || Spacewatch || — || align=right | 2.1 km || 
|-id=648 bgcolor=#E9E9E9
| 478648 ||  || — || September 17, 2012 || Kitt Peak || Spacewatch || EUN || align=right | 1.0 km || 
|-id=649 bgcolor=#E9E9E9
| 478649 ||  || — || September 24, 2008 || Kitt Peak || Spacewatch || — || align=right data-sort-value="0.98" | 980 m || 
|-id=650 bgcolor=#E9E9E9
| 478650 ||  || — || September 8, 2008 || Kitt Peak || Spacewatch || — || align=right | 1.5 km || 
|-id=651 bgcolor=#E9E9E9
| 478651 ||  || — || September 30, 2008 || Catalina || CSS || — || align=right | 2.9 km || 
|-id=652 bgcolor=#fefefe
| 478652 ||  || — || January 25, 2006 || Kitt Peak || Spacewatch || MAS || align=right data-sort-value="0.70" | 700 m || 
|-id=653 bgcolor=#E9E9E9
| 478653 ||  || — || September 23, 2008 || Mount Lemmon || Mount Lemmon Survey || — || align=right data-sort-value="0.77" | 770 m || 
|-id=654 bgcolor=#E9E9E9
| 478654 ||  || — || October 8, 2012 || Kitt Peak || Spacewatch || — || align=right | 1.4 km || 
|-id=655 bgcolor=#E9E9E9
| 478655 ||  || — || October 16, 1995 || Kitt Peak || Spacewatch || EUN || align=right data-sort-value="0.96" | 960 m || 
|-id=656 bgcolor=#E9E9E9
| 478656 ||  || — || September 9, 2008 || Mount Lemmon || Mount Lemmon Survey || — || align=right data-sort-value="0.94" | 940 m || 
|-id=657 bgcolor=#E9E9E9
| 478657 ||  || — || September 16, 2012 || Kitt Peak || Spacewatch || — || align=right data-sort-value="0.82" | 820 m || 
|-id=658 bgcolor=#E9E9E9
| 478658 ||  || — || May 22, 2011 || Mount Lemmon || Mount Lemmon Survey || — || align=right | 1.1 km || 
|-id=659 bgcolor=#E9E9E9
| 478659 ||  || — || November 20, 2008 || Mount Lemmon || Mount Lemmon Survey || (5) || align=right data-sort-value="0.82" | 820 m || 
|-id=660 bgcolor=#E9E9E9
| 478660 ||  || — || December 2, 2008 || Kitt Peak || Spacewatch || — || align=right | 1.5 km || 
|-id=661 bgcolor=#E9E9E9
| 478661 ||  || — || October 30, 2008 || Catalina || CSS || — || align=right data-sort-value="0.92" | 920 m || 
|-id=662 bgcolor=#E9E9E9
| 478662 ||  || — || October 21, 2008 || Kitt Peak || Spacewatch || — || align=right data-sort-value="0.93" | 930 m || 
|-id=663 bgcolor=#E9E9E9
| 478663 ||  || — || August 28, 2012 || Mount Lemmon || Mount Lemmon Survey || — || align=right | 2.5 km || 
|-id=664 bgcolor=#fefefe
| 478664 ||  || — || March 20, 2010 || Mount Lemmon || Mount Lemmon Survey || fast? || align=right data-sort-value="0.87" | 870 m || 
|-id=665 bgcolor=#E9E9E9
| 478665 ||  || — || October 27, 2008 || Mount Lemmon || Mount Lemmon Survey || — || align=right data-sort-value="0.77" | 770 m || 
|-id=666 bgcolor=#E9E9E9
| 478666 ||  || — || September 23, 2008 || Mount Lemmon || Mount Lemmon Survey || — || align=right | 1.2 km || 
|-id=667 bgcolor=#E9E9E9
| 478667 ||  || — || October 8, 2012 || Mount Lemmon || Mount Lemmon Survey || — || align=right | 1.5 km || 
|-id=668 bgcolor=#E9E9E9
| 478668 ||  || — || December 29, 2008 || Mount Lemmon || Mount Lemmon Survey || — || align=right | 2.0 km || 
|-id=669 bgcolor=#E9E9E9
| 478669 ||  || — || October 29, 2008 || Kitt Peak || Spacewatch || — || align=right | 1.4 km || 
|-id=670 bgcolor=#E9E9E9
| 478670 ||  || — || October 16, 2003 || Kitt Peak || Spacewatch || NEM || align=right | 2.0 km || 
|-id=671 bgcolor=#E9E9E9
| 478671 ||  || — || September 24, 2008 || Kitt Peak || Spacewatch || — || align=right data-sort-value="0.90" | 900 m || 
|-id=672 bgcolor=#E9E9E9
| 478672 ||  || — || October 26, 2008 || Kitt Peak || Spacewatch || EUN || align=right data-sort-value="0.89" | 890 m || 
|-id=673 bgcolor=#E9E9E9
| 478673 ||  || — || December 5, 2008 || Kitt Peak || Spacewatch || — || align=right | 1.2 km || 
|-id=674 bgcolor=#E9E9E9
| 478674 ||  || — || November 1, 2008 || Mount Lemmon || Mount Lemmon Survey || (5) || align=right data-sort-value="0.69" | 690 m || 
|-id=675 bgcolor=#E9E9E9
| 478675 ||  || — || October 14, 2012 || Kitt Peak || Spacewatch || — || align=right | 1.4 km || 
|-id=676 bgcolor=#E9E9E9
| 478676 ||  || — || December 29, 2008 || Mount Lemmon || Mount Lemmon Survey || — || align=right | 1.5 km || 
|-id=677 bgcolor=#E9E9E9
| 478677 ||  || — || November 7, 2008 || Mount Lemmon || Mount Lemmon Survey || — || align=right data-sort-value="0.83" | 830 m || 
|-id=678 bgcolor=#E9E9E9
| 478678 ||  || — || January 20, 2009 || Kitt Peak || Spacewatch || — || align=right | 1.2 km || 
|-id=679 bgcolor=#E9E9E9
| 478679 ||  || — || August 25, 1995 || Kitt Peak || Spacewatch || KON || align=right | 1.9 km || 
|-id=680 bgcolor=#E9E9E9
| 478680 ||  || — || November 16, 2003 || Kitt Peak || Spacewatch || — || align=right | 2.0 km || 
|-id=681 bgcolor=#E9E9E9
| 478681 ||  || — || September 29, 2008 || Catalina || CSS || — || align=right data-sort-value="0.91" | 910 m || 
|-id=682 bgcolor=#fefefe
| 478682 ||  || — || October 28, 2005 || Kitt Peak || Spacewatch || — || align=right | 1.1 km || 
|-id=683 bgcolor=#fefefe
| 478683 ||  || — || August 5, 2008 || Siding Spring || SSS || — || align=right data-sort-value="0.97" | 970 m || 
|-id=684 bgcolor=#E9E9E9
| 478684 ||  || — || November 16, 2003 || Catalina || CSS || — || align=right | 2.0 km || 
|-id=685 bgcolor=#E9E9E9
| 478685 ||  || — || December 1, 2008 || Kitt Peak || Spacewatch || — || align=right | 1.5 km || 
|-id=686 bgcolor=#E9E9E9
| 478686 ||  || — || October 30, 2008 || Catalina || CSS || — || align=right | 1.1 km || 
|-id=687 bgcolor=#E9E9E9
| 478687 ||  || — || November 17, 2008 || Catalina || CSS || EUN || align=right | 1.4 km || 
|-id=688 bgcolor=#fefefe
| 478688 ||  || — || September 19, 2001 || Socorro || LINEAR || — || align=right data-sort-value="0.85" | 850 m || 
|-id=689 bgcolor=#E9E9E9
| 478689 ||  || — || August 28, 2012 || Mount Lemmon || Mount Lemmon Survey || — || align=right | 1.2 km || 
|-id=690 bgcolor=#E9E9E9
| 478690 ||  || — || November 18, 1996 || Kitt Peak || Spacewatch || — || align=right data-sort-value="0.66" | 660 m || 
|-id=691 bgcolor=#E9E9E9
| 478691 ||  || — || September 15, 2012 || Mount Lemmon || Mount Lemmon Survey || — || align=right | 1.3 km || 
|-id=692 bgcolor=#E9E9E9
| 478692 ||  || — || November 1, 2008 || Kitt Peak || Spacewatch || — || align=right | 1.2 km || 
|-id=693 bgcolor=#E9E9E9
| 478693 ||  || — || October 8, 2012 || Catalina || CSS || — || align=right | 1.5 km || 
|-id=694 bgcolor=#E9E9E9
| 478694 ||  || — || October 17, 2012 || Mount Lemmon || Mount Lemmon Survey || — || align=right | 1.6 km || 
|-id=695 bgcolor=#E9E9E9
| 478695 ||  || — || May 19, 2006 || Mount Lemmon || Mount Lemmon Survey || AGN || align=right | 1.1 km || 
|-id=696 bgcolor=#E9E9E9
| 478696 ||  || — || March 2, 2006 || Kitt Peak || Spacewatch || MAR || align=right | 1.2 km || 
|-id=697 bgcolor=#E9E9E9
| 478697 ||  || — || October 16, 2012 || Kitt Peak || Spacewatch || — || align=right | 2.4 km || 
|-id=698 bgcolor=#fefefe
| 478698 ||  || — || September 7, 2008 || Mount Lemmon || Mount Lemmon Survey || SUL || align=right | 2.1 km || 
|-id=699 bgcolor=#E9E9E9
| 478699 ||  || — || December 30, 2008 || Kitt Peak || Spacewatch || — || align=right | 1.2 km || 
|-id=700 bgcolor=#E9E9E9
| 478700 ||  || — || October 16, 2012 || Kitt Peak || Spacewatch || AEO || align=right data-sort-value="0.80" | 800 m || 
|}

478701–478800 

|-bgcolor=#E9E9E9
| 478701 ||  || — || October 16, 2012 || Kitt Peak || Spacewatch || — || align=right | 1.3 km || 
|-id=702 bgcolor=#E9E9E9
| 478702 ||  || — || October 16, 2012 || Kitt Peak || Spacewatch || — || align=right data-sort-value="0.94" | 940 m || 
|-id=703 bgcolor=#E9E9E9
| 478703 ||  || — || October 16, 2012 || Kitt Peak || Spacewatch || — || align=right | 1.1 km || 
|-id=704 bgcolor=#E9E9E9
| 478704 ||  || — || November 22, 2008 || Kitt Peak || Spacewatch || — || align=right | 1.4 km || 
|-id=705 bgcolor=#E9E9E9
| 478705 ||  || — || October 9, 1999 || Kitt Peak || Spacewatch || — || align=right | 1.5 km || 
|-id=706 bgcolor=#d6d6d6
| 478706 ||  || — || October 16, 2012 || Mount Lemmon || Mount Lemmon Survey || — || align=right | 2.1 km || 
|-id=707 bgcolor=#E9E9E9
| 478707 ||  || — || November 2, 2008 || Kitt Peak || Spacewatch || — || align=right data-sort-value="0.91" | 910 m || 
|-id=708 bgcolor=#E9E9E9
| 478708 ||  || — || September 22, 2003 || Anderson Mesa || LONEOS || — || align=right | 1.9 km || 
|-id=709 bgcolor=#E9E9E9
| 478709 ||  || — || October 20, 2008 || Kitt Peak || Spacewatch || ADE || align=right | 2.0 km || 
|-id=710 bgcolor=#E9E9E9
| 478710 ||  || — || January 13, 2005 || Kitt Peak || Spacewatch || — || align=right | 1.2 km || 
|-id=711 bgcolor=#E9E9E9
| 478711 ||  || — || October 2, 2008 || Kitt Peak || Spacewatch || — || align=right | 1.1 km || 
|-id=712 bgcolor=#E9E9E9
| 478712 ||  || — || October 23, 2008 || Mount Lemmon || Mount Lemmon Survey || — || align=right data-sort-value="0.68" | 680 m || 
|-id=713 bgcolor=#E9E9E9
| 478713 ||  || — || May 22, 2011 || Mount Lemmon || Mount Lemmon Survey || — || align=right data-sort-value="0.99" | 990 m || 
|-id=714 bgcolor=#E9E9E9
| 478714 ||  || — || October 1, 2008 || Mount Lemmon || Mount Lemmon Survey || critical || align=right data-sort-value="0.65" | 650 m || 
|-id=715 bgcolor=#E9E9E9
| 478715 ||  || — || September 10, 2007 || Kitt Peak || Spacewatch || HOF || align=right | 2.0 km || 
|-id=716 bgcolor=#E9E9E9
| 478716 ||  || — || May 8, 2011 || Mount Lemmon || Mount Lemmon Survey || MIS || align=right | 2.1 km || 
|-id=717 bgcolor=#E9E9E9
| 478717 ||  || — || October 8, 2008 || Mount Lemmon || Mount Lemmon Survey || — || align=right | 1.00 km || 
|-id=718 bgcolor=#E9E9E9
| 478718 ||  || — || October 24, 2008 || Kitt Peak || Spacewatch || — || align=right data-sort-value="0.76" | 760 m || 
|-id=719 bgcolor=#E9E9E9
| 478719 ||  || — || November 6, 2008 || Mount Lemmon || Mount Lemmon Survey || EUN || align=right data-sort-value="0.84" | 840 m || 
|-id=720 bgcolor=#E9E9E9
| 478720 ||  || — || November 19, 2008 || Kitt Peak || Spacewatch || — || align=right | 1.3 km || 
|-id=721 bgcolor=#E9E9E9
| 478721 ||  || — || October 5, 2012 || Kitt Peak || Spacewatch || — || align=right | 1.7 km || 
|-id=722 bgcolor=#E9E9E9
| 478722 ||  || — || October 15, 2007 || Kitt Peak || Spacewatch || AGN || align=right data-sort-value="0.96" | 960 m || 
|-id=723 bgcolor=#E9E9E9
| 478723 ||  || — || December 31, 2008 || Catalina || CSS || — || align=right | 1.5 km || 
|-id=724 bgcolor=#E9E9E9
| 478724 ||  || — || September 9, 2008 || Mount Lemmon || Mount Lemmon Survey || KON || align=right | 2.2 km || 
|-id=725 bgcolor=#E9E9E9
| 478725 ||  || — || October 24, 2008 || Kitt Peak || Spacewatch || — || align=right data-sort-value="0.91" | 910 m || 
|-id=726 bgcolor=#E9E9E9
| 478726 ||  || — || October 3, 2008 || Mount Lemmon || Mount Lemmon Survey || EUN || align=right | 1.4 km || 
|-id=727 bgcolor=#E9E9E9
| 478727 ||  || — || November 8, 2008 || Mount Lemmon || Mount Lemmon Survey || — || align=right | 1.2 km || 
|-id=728 bgcolor=#E9E9E9
| 478728 ||  || — || October 20, 2012 || Mount Lemmon || Mount Lemmon Survey || — || align=right | 1.1 km || 
|-id=729 bgcolor=#E9E9E9
| 478729 ||  || — || October 16, 2012 || Kitt Peak || Spacewatch || MRX || align=right | 1.1 km || 
|-id=730 bgcolor=#E9E9E9
| 478730 ||  || — || January 13, 2005 || Catalina || CSS || — || align=right data-sort-value="0.81" | 810 m || 
|-id=731 bgcolor=#E9E9E9
| 478731 ||  || — || May 9, 2011 || Mount Lemmon || Mount Lemmon Survey || — || align=right | 1.6 km || 
|-id=732 bgcolor=#E9E9E9
| 478732 ||  || — || April 15, 2010 || Mount Lemmon || Mount Lemmon Survey || — || align=right | 1.2 km || 
|-id=733 bgcolor=#E9E9E9
| 478733 ||  || — || October 16, 2012 || Kitt Peak || Spacewatch || — || align=right | 1.0 km || 
|-id=734 bgcolor=#E9E9E9
| 478734 ||  || — || November 4, 2004 || Kitt Peak || Spacewatch || — || align=right | 1.1 km || 
|-id=735 bgcolor=#E9E9E9
| 478735 ||  || — || October 14, 2012 || Catalina || CSS || — || align=right data-sort-value="0.98" | 980 m || 
|-id=736 bgcolor=#E9E9E9
| 478736 ||  || — || August 28, 2012 || Mount Lemmon || Mount Lemmon Survey || — || align=right data-sort-value="0.91" | 910 m || 
|-id=737 bgcolor=#E9E9E9
| 478737 ||  || — || October 23, 2008 || Kitt Peak || Spacewatch || — || align=right data-sort-value="0.73" | 730 m || 
|-id=738 bgcolor=#E9E9E9
| 478738 ||  || — || September 18, 2003 || Kitt Peak || Spacewatch || — || align=right | 1.0 km || 
|-id=739 bgcolor=#fefefe
| 478739 ||  || — || September 13, 2004 || Anderson Mesa || LONEOS || — || align=right data-sort-value="0.74" | 740 m || 
|-id=740 bgcolor=#E9E9E9
| 478740 ||  || — || September 27, 2008 || Mount Lemmon || Mount Lemmon Survey || KON || align=right | 1.6 km || 
|-id=741 bgcolor=#E9E9E9
| 478741 ||  || — || October 22, 2008 || Kitt Peak || Spacewatch || EUN || align=right | 1.1 km || 
|-id=742 bgcolor=#E9E9E9
| 478742 ||  || — || March 18, 2010 || Mount Lemmon || Mount Lemmon Survey || — || align=right data-sort-value="0.95" | 950 m || 
|-id=743 bgcolor=#E9E9E9
| 478743 ||  || — || November 27, 1995 || Kitt Peak || Spacewatch || MAR || align=right data-sort-value="0.93" | 930 m || 
|-id=744 bgcolor=#E9E9E9
| 478744 ||  || — || October 20, 2012 || Kitt Peak || Spacewatch || — || align=right | 1.7 km || 
|-id=745 bgcolor=#E9E9E9
| 478745 ||  || — || October 16, 1995 || Kitt Peak || Spacewatch || critical || align=right | 1.2 km || 
|-id=746 bgcolor=#E9E9E9
| 478746 ||  || — || October 10, 2012 || Kitt Peak || Spacewatch || — || align=right | 1.4 km || 
|-id=747 bgcolor=#E9E9E9
| 478747 ||  || — || October 20, 2008 || Kitt Peak || Spacewatch || MAR || align=right data-sort-value="0.66" | 660 m || 
|-id=748 bgcolor=#E9E9E9
| 478748 ||  || — || October 14, 2012 || Kitt Peak || Spacewatch || — || align=right data-sort-value="0.89" | 890 m || 
|-id=749 bgcolor=#d6d6d6
| 478749 ||  || — || November 3, 2007 || Kitt Peak || Spacewatch || EOS || align=right | 1.6 km || 
|-id=750 bgcolor=#fefefe
| 478750 ||  || — || June 17, 2005 || Mount Lemmon || Mount Lemmon Survey || — || align=right data-sort-value="0.89" | 890 m || 
|-id=751 bgcolor=#E9E9E9
| 478751 ||  || — || March 26, 2010 || Kitt Peak || Spacewatch || AGN || align=right | 1.00 km || 
|-id=752 bgcolor=#E9E9E9
| 478752 ||  || — || October 26, 2008 || Mount Lemmon || Mount Lemmon Survey || (5) || align=right data-sort-value="0.80" | 800 m || 
|-id=753 bgcolor=#E9E9E9
| 478753 ||  || — || October 18, 2012 || Mount Lemmon || Mount Lemmon Survey || — || align=right | 1.1 km || 
|-id=754 bgcolor=#E9E9E9
| 478754 ||  || — || October 21, 2008 || Kitt Peak || Spacewatch || — || align=right | 1.8 km || 
|-id=755 bgcolor=#d6d6d6
| 478755 ||  || — || October 7, 2007 || Mount Lemmon || Mount Lemmon Survey || — || align=right | 1.7 km || 
|-id=756 bgcolor=#E9E9E9
| 478756 ||  || — || September 24, 1995 || Kitt Peak || Spacewatch || — || align=right | 1.0 km || 
|-id=757 bgcolor=#E9E9E9
| 478757 ||  || — || October 30, 2008 || Kitt Peak || Spacewatch || — || align=right data-sort-value="0.94" | 940 m || 
|-id=758 bgcolor=#E9E9E9
| 478758 ||  || — || September 25, 2008 || Kitt Peak || Spacewatch || — || align=right data-sort-value="0.83" | 830 m || 
|-id=759 bgcolor=#E9E9E9
| 478759 ||  || — || September 30, 2003 || Kitt Peak || Spacewatch || — || align=right | 1.1 km || 
|-id=760 bgcolor=#E9E9E9
| 478760 ||  || — || October 16, 2007 || Mount Lemmon || Mount Lemmon Survey || 526 || align=right | 2.2 km || 
|-id=761 bgcolor=#E9E9E9
| 478761 ||  || — || September 19, 2012 || Mount Lemmon || Mount Lemmon Survey || — || align=right | 1.7 km || 
|-id=762 bgcolor=#E9E9E9
| 478762 ||  || — || April 13, 2011 || Kitt Peak || Spacewatch || — || align=right | 1.8 km || 
|-id=763 bgcolor=#E9E9E9
| 478763 ||  || — || September 18, 2012 || Mount Lemmon || Mount Lemmon Survey || — || align=right | 1.4 km || 
|-id=764 bgcolor=#E9E9E9
| 478764 ||  || — || October 3, 2008 || Mount Lemmon || Mount Lemmon Survey || (5) || align=right data-sort-value="0.65" | 650 m || 
|-id=765 bgcolor=#E9E9E9
| 478765 ||  || — || September 15, 2012 || Kitt Peak || Spacewatch || — || align=right | 1.4 km || 
|-id=766 bgcolor=#E9E9E9
| 478766 ||  || — || May 20, 2006 || Mount Lemmon || Mount Lemmon Survey || — || align=right | 2.5 km || 
|-id=767 bgcolor=#E9E9E9
| 478767 ||  || — || May 25, 2011 || Mount Lemmon || Mount Lemmon Survey || — || align=right | 1.2 km || 
|-id=768 bgcolor=#E9E9E9
| 478768 ||  || — || April 2, 2006 || Kitt Peak || Spacewatch || — || align=right | 1.5 km || 
|-id=769 bgcolor=#E9E9E9
| 478769 ||  || — || October 15, 2012 || Kitt Peak || Spacewatch || — || align=right | 2.1 km || 
|-id=770 bgcolor=#E9E9E9
| 478770 ||  || — || January 16, 2005 || Kitt Peak || Spacewatch || — || align=right | 1.5 km || 
|-id=771 bgcolor=#E9E9E9
| 478771 ||  || — || January 16, 2010 || WISE || WISE || — || align=right | 4.2 km || 
|-id=772 bgcolor=#E9E9E9
| 478772 ||  || — || May 31, 2011 || Mount Lemmon || Mount Lemmon Survey || — || align=right | 1.00 km || 
|-id=773 bgcolor=#E9E9E9
| 478773 ||  || — || February 16, 2010 || Mount Lemmon || Mount Lemmon Survey || — || align=right | 1.1 km || 
|-id=774 bgcolor=#E9E9E9
| 478774 ||  || — || November 20, 2008 || Kitt Peak || Spacewatch || — || align=right data-sort-value="0.68" | 680 m || 
|-id=775 bgcolor=#E9E9E9
| 478775 ||  || — || October 16, 2012 || Kitt Peak || Spacewatch || — || align=right | 2.8 km || 
|-id=776 bgcolor=#E9E9E9
| 478776 ||  || — || October 26, 2008 || Kitt Peak || Spacewatch || JUN || align=right | 1.1 km || 
|-id=777 bgcolor=#E9E9E9
| 478777 ||  || — || September 7, 2008 || Mount Lemmon || Mount Lemmon Survey || — || align=right data-sort-value="0.95" | 950 m || 
|-id=778 bgcolor=#E9E9E9
| 478778 ||  || — || January 11, 2005 || Socorro || LINEAR || — || align=right | 1.7 km || 
|-id=779 bgcolor=#E9E9E9
| 478779 ||  || — || October 17, 2012 || Mount Lemmon || Mount Lemmon Survey || — || align=right data-sort-value="0.95" | 950 m || 
|-id=780 bgcolor=#E9E9E9
| 478780 ||  || — || October 25, 2008 || Catalina || CSS || — || align=right | 1.4 km || 
|-id=781 bgcolor=#E9E9E9
| 478781 ||  || — || June 15, 2007 || Kitt Peak || Spacewatch || — || align=right | 1.7 km || 
|-id=782 bgcolor=#E9E9E9
| 478782 ||  || — || May 4, 2010 || WISE || WISE || — || align=right | 4.1 km || 
|-id=783 bgcolor=#E9E9E9
| 478783 ||  || — || December 3, 2008 || Socorro || LINEAR || — || align=right | 1.4 km || 
|-id=784 bgcolor=#FFC2E0
| 478784 ||  || — || October 22, 2012 || Mount Lemmon || Mount Lemmon Survey || APO || align=right data-sort-value="0.027" | 27 m || 
|-id=785 bgcolor=#fefefe
| 478785 ||  || — || October 6, 2008 || Mount Lemmon || Mount Lemmon Survey || — || align=right data-sort-value="0.85" | 850 m || 
|-id=786 bgcolor=#E9E9E9
| 478786 ||  || — || February 3, 2005 || Socorro || LINEAR || — || align=right | 1.6 km || 
|-id=787 bgcolor=#E9E9E9
| 478787 ||  || — || January 30, 2006 || Kitt Peak || Spacewatch || — || align=right data-sort-value="0.88" | 880 m || 
|-id=788 bgcolor=#E9E9E9
| 478788 ||  || — || November 4, 2004 || Kitt Peak || Spacewatch || — || align=right data-sort-value="0.77" | 770 m || 
|-id=789 bgcolor=#E9E9E9
| 478789 ||  || — || March 26, 2011 || Kitt Peak || Spacewatch || (5) || align=right data-sort-value="0.85" | 850 m || 
|-id=790 bgcolor=#E9E9E9
| 478790 ||  || — || October 22, 1995 || Kitt Peak || Spacewatch || (5) || align=right data-sort-value="0.77" | 770 m || 
|-id=791 bgcolor=#E9E9E9
| 478791 ||  || — || September 4, 2007 || Catalina || CSS || — || align=right | 2.0 km || 
|-id=792 bgcolor=#E9E9E9
| 478792 ||  || — || September 9, 2007 || Kitt Peak || Spacewatch || — || align=right | 1.7 km || 
|-id=793 bgcolor=#E9E9E9
| 478793 ||  || — || October 10, 2012 || Kitt Peak || Spacewatch || — || align=right | 1.7 km || 
|-id=794 bgcolor=#E9E9E9
| 478794 ||  || — || September 10, 2007 || Kitt Peak || Spacewatch || — || align=right | 1.7 km || 
|-id=795 bgcolor=#E9E9E9
| 478795 ||  || — || September 21, 1995 || Kitt Peak || Spacewatch || (5) || align=right data-sort-value="0.64" | 640 m || 
|-id=796 bgcolor=#E9E9E9
| 478796 ||  || — || December 1, 2003 || Socorro || LINEAR || — || align=right | 1.9 km || 
|-id=797 bgcolor=#E9E9E9
| 478797 ||  || — || December 30, 2008 || Kitt Peak || Spacewatch || AGN || align=right | 1.1 km || 
|-id=798 bgcolor=#E9E9E9
| 478798 ||  || — || November 11, 1999 || Kitt Peak || Spacewatch || — || align=right | 1.4 km || 
|-id=799 bgcolor=#E9E9E9
| 478799 ||  || — || December 5, 2008 || Catalina || CSS || JUN || align=right data-sort-value="0.89" | 890 m || 
|-id=800 bgcolor=#E9E9E9
| 478800 ||  || — || October 26, 2008 || Kitt Peak || Spacewatch || — || align=right data-sort-value="0.86" | 860 m || 
|}

478801–478900 

|-bgcolor=#E9E9E9
| 478801 ||  || — || December 1, 2008 || Kitt Peak || Spacewatch || — || align=right | 1.9 km || 
|-id=802 bgcolor=#fefefe
| 478802 ||  || — || February 13, 2002 || Kitt Peak || Spacewatch || — || align=right data-sort-value="0.63" | 630 m || 
|-id=803 bgcolor=#E9E9E9
| 478803 ||  || — || November 2, 2008 || Mount Lemmon || Mount Lemmon Survey || — || align=right | 1.3 km || 
|-id=804 bgcolor=#E9E9E9
| 478804 ||  || — || February 1, 1995 || Kitt Peak || Spacewatch || — || align=right | 1.9 km || 
|-id=805 bgcolor=#E9E9E9
| 478805 ||  || — || September 3, 2008 || Kitt Peak || Spacewatch || — || align=right | 1.6 km || 
|-id=806 bgcolor=#E9E9E9
| 478806 ||  || — || February 2, 2005 || Kitt Peak || Spacewatch || — || align=right | 1.3 km || 
|-id=807 bgcolor=#E9E9E9
| 478807 ||  || — || November 19, 2003 || Kitt Peak || Spacewatch || — || align=right | 2.4 km || 
|-id=808 bgcolor=#FA8072
| 478808 ||  || — || April 28, 2011 || Kitt Peak || Spacewatch || — || align=right | 2.7 km || 
|-id=809 bgcolor=#fefefe
| 478809 ||  || — || October 6, 2008 || Mount Lemmon || Mount Lemmon Survey || — || align=right data-sort-value="0.98" | 980 m || 
|-id=810 bgcolor=#E9E9E9
| 478810 ||  || — || November 7, 2008 || Mount Lemmon || Mount Lemmon Survey || — || align=right | 1.1 km || 
|-id=811 bgcolor=#E9E9E9
| 478811 ||  || — || October 17, 2012 || Mount Lemmon || Mount Lemmon Survey || MAR || align=right | 1.1 km || 
|-id=812 bgcolor=#E9E9E9
| 478812 ||  || — || November 10, 1999 || Kitt Peak || Spacewatch || — || align=right | 1.6 km || 
|-id=813 bgcolor=#E9E9E9
| 478813 ||  || — || September 19, 2012 || Mount Lemmon || Mount Lemmon Survey || KONcritical || align=right | 1.8 km || 
|-id=814 bgcolor=#E9E9E9
| 478814 ||  || — || December 16, 2000 || Kitt Peak || Spacewatch || — || align=right | 1.2 km || 
|-id=815 bgcolor=#E9E9E9
| 478815 ||  || — || October 15, 2012 || Kitt Peak || Spacewatch || ADE || align=right | 1.9 km || 
|-id=816 bgcolor=#E9E9E9
| 478816 ||  || — || November 7, 2008 || Mount Lemmon || Mount Lemmon Survey || — || align=right | 1.1 km || 
|-id=817 bgcolor=#E9E9E9
| 478817 ||  || — || March 24, 2006 || Mount Lemmon || Mount Lemmon Survey || ADE || align=right | 1.8 km || 
|-id=818 bgcolor=#E9E9E9
| 478818 ||  || — || October 21, 2012 || Kitt Peak || Spacewatch || — || align=right | 1.5 km || 
|-id=819 bgcolor=#E9E9E9
| 478819 ||  || — || October 17, 2012 || Mount Lemmon || Mount Lemmon Survey || — || align=right | 1.3 km || 
|-id=820 bgcolor=#E9E9E9
| 478820 ||  || — || August 24, 2007 || Kitt Peak || Spacewatch || — || align=right | 1.8 km || 
|-id=821 bgcolor=#E9E9E9
| 478821 ||  || — || December 29, 2008 || Mount Lemmon || Mount Lemmon Survey || — || align=right | 1.7 km || 
|-id=822 bgcolor=#fefefe
| 478822 ||  || — || November 21, 2001 || Socorro || LINEAR || — || align=right data-sort-value="0.92" | 920 m || 
|-id=823 bgcolor=#E9E9E9
| 478823 ||  || — || September 7, 2008 || Mount Lemmon || Mount Lemmon Survey || — || align=right data-sort-value="0.84" | 840 m || 
|-id=824 bgcolor=#E9E9E9
| 478824 ||  || — || October 1, 2008 || Mount Lemmon || Mount Lemmon Survey || — || align=right data-sort-value="0.72" | 720 m || 
|-id=825 bgcolor=#fefefe
| 478825 ||  || — || October 7, 2008 || Kitt Peak || Spacewatch || — || align=right data-sort-value="0.68" | 680 m || 
|-id=826 bgcolor=#E9E9E9
| 478826 ||  || — || October 31, 2008 || Catalina || CSS || — || align=right | 1.1 km || 
|-id=827 bgcolor=#E9E9E9
| 478827 ||  || — || October 23, 2008 || Mount Lemmon || Mount Lemmon Survey || — || align=right | 1.6 km || 
|-id=828 bgcolor=#E9E9E9
| 478828 ||  || — || April 29, 2011 || Mount Lemmon || Mount Lemmon Survey || — || align=right | 1.2 km || 
|-id=829 bgcolor=#E9E9E9
| 478829 ||  || — || December 9, 2004 || Kitt Peak || Spacewatch || — || align=right data-sort-value="0.68" | 680 m || 
|-id=830 bgcolor=#E9E9E9
| 478830 ||  || — || December 1, 2008 || Kitt Peak || Spacewatch || — || align=right data-sort-value="0.86" | 860 m || 
|-id=831 bgcolor=#E9E9E9
| 478831 ||  || — || April 24, 2006 || Kitt Peak || Spacewatch || — || align=right | 1.9 km || 
|-id=832 bgcolor=#E9E9E9
| 478832 ||  || — || October 9, 2012 || Mount Lemmon || Mount Lemmon Survey || — || align=right | 1.1 km || 
|-id=833 bgcolor=#E9E9E9
| 478833 ||  || — || April 17, 2010 || Mount Lemmon || Mount Lemmon Survey || — || align=right | 1.1 km || 
|-id=834 bgcolor=#E9E9E9
| 478834 ||  || — || December 18, 2004 || Mount Lemmon || Mount Lemmon Survey || EUN || align=right | 1.0 km || 
|-id=835 bgcolor=#E9E9E9
| 478835 ||  || — || September 11, 2007 || Mount Lemmon || Mount Lemmon Survey || — || align=right | 1.9 km || 
|-id=836 bgcolor=#E9E9E9
| 478836 ||  || — || July 29, 2011 || Siding Spring || SSS || — || align=right | 1.9 km || 
|-id=837 bgcolor=#E9E9E9
| 478837 ||  || — || March 18, 2010 || Kitt Peak || Spacewatch || — || align=right | 2.2 km || 
|-id=838 bgcolor=#E9E9E9
| 478838 ||  || — || October 20, 2012 || Kitt Peak || Spacewatch || — || align=right | 1.6 km || 
|-id=839 bgcolor=#E9E9E9
| 478839 ||  || — || September 30, 2003 || Kitt Peak || Spacewatch || — || align=right | 1.6 km || 
|-id=840 bgcolor=#E9E9E9
| 478840 ||  || — || October 6, 1999 || Socorro || LINEAR || — || align=right data-sort-value="0.94" | 940 m || 
|-id=841 bgcolor=#E9E9E9
| 478841 ||  || — || November 7, 2012 || Mount Lemmon || Mount Lemmon Survey || — || align=right | 2.0 km || 
|-id=842 bgcolor=#E9E9E9
| 478842 ||  || — || September 30, 2003 || Kitt Peak || Spacewatch || — || align=right | 1.4 km || 
|-id=843 bgcolor=#E9E9E9
| 478843 ||  || — || September 12, 2007 || Mount Lemmon || Mount Lemmon Survey || AGN || align=right | 1.0 km || 
|-id=844 bgcolor=#E9E9E9
| 478844 ||  || — || October 5, 2012 || Kitt Peak || Spacewatch || — || align=right | 1.2 km || 
|-id=845 bgcolor=#E9E9E9
| 478845 ||  || — || December 11, 2004 || Kitt Peak || Spacewatch || (5) || align=right data-sort-value="0.88" | 880 m || 
|-id=846 bgcolor=#E9E9E9
| 478846 ||  || — || May 8, 2006 || Kitt Peak || Spacewatch || EUN || align=right data-sort-value="0.95" | 950 m || 
|-id=847 bgcolor=#E9E9E9
| 478847 ||  || — || October 31, 2008 || Kitt Peak || Spacewatch || — || align=right data-sort-value="0.95" | 950 m || 
|-id=848 bgcolor=#E9E9E9
| 478848 ||  || — || November 3, 2008 || Kitt Peak || Spacewatch || — || align=right data-sort-value="0.93" | 930 m || 
|-id=849 bgcolor=#E9E9E9
| 478849 ||  || — || September 13, 2007 || Mount Lemmon || Mount Lemmon Survey || AGN || align=right data-sort-value="0.93" | 930 m || 
|-id=850 bgcolor=#E9E9E9
| 478850 ||  || — || October 16, 2012 || Kitt Peak || Spacewatch || — || align=right | 1.3 km || 
|-id=851 bgcolor=#E9E9E9
| 478851 ||  || — || December 1, 2008 || Kitt Peak || Spacewatch || — || align=right | 1.2 km || 
|-id=852 bgcolor=#E9E9E9
| 478852 ||  || — || May 25, 2006 || Kitt Peak || Spacewatch || — || align=right | 2.0 km || 
|-id=853 bgcolor=#E9E9E9
| 478853 ||  || — || September 29, 2008 || Mount Lemmon || Mount Lemmon Survey || — || align=right data-sort-value="0.79" | 790 m || 
|-id=854 bgcolor=#E9E9E9
| 478854 ||  || — || November 21, 2008 || Kitt Peak || Spacewatch || (5) || align=right data-sort-value="0.59" | 590 m || 
|-id=855 bgcolor=#E9E9E9
| 478855 ||  || — || May 24, 2006 || Kitt Peak || Spacewatch || NEM || align=right | 2.0 km || 
|-id=856 bgcolor=#d6d6d6
| 478856 ||  || — || October 9, 2007 || Mount Lemmon || Mount Lemmon Survey || KOR || align=right | 1.1 km || 
|-id=857 bgcolor=#E9E9E9
| 478857 ||  || — || November 26, 2003 || Kitt Peak || Spacewatch || — || align=right | 2.6 km || 
|-id=858 bgcolor=#E9E9E9
| 478858 ||  || — || October 14, 2012 || Catalina || CSS || EUN || align=right | 1.2 km || 
|-id=859 bgcolor=#E9E9E9
| 478859 ||  || — || October 9, 2012 || Mount Lemmon || Mount Lemmon Survey || (5) || align=right data-sort-value="0.78" | 780 m || 
|-id=860 bgcolor=#E9E9E9
| 478860 ||  || — || October 29, 2008 || Kitt Peak || Spacewatch || — || align=right | 1.2 km || 
|-id=861 bgcolor=#E9E9E9
| 478861 ||  || — || October 15, 2007 || Kitt Peak || Spacewatch || — || align=right | 1.6 km || 
|-id=862 bgcolor=#E9E9E9
| 478862 ||  || — || October 21, 2012 || Kitt Peak || Spacewatch || — || align=right data-sort-value="0.91" | 910 m || 
|-id=863 bgcolor=#E9E9E9
| 478863 ||  || — || December 3, 2008 || Mount Lemmon || Mount Lemmon Survey || MRX || align=right | 1.1 km || 
|-id=864 bgcolor=#E9E9E9
| 478864 ||  || — || December 12, 2004 || Kitt Peak || Spacewatch || KON || align=right | 2.1 km || 
|-id=865 bgcolor=#E9E9E9
| 478865 ||  || — || November 22, 2008 || Kitt Peak || Spacewatch || — || align=right data-sort-value="0.83" | 830 m || 
|-id=866 bgcolor=#E9E9E9
| 478866 ||  || — || December 9, 2004 || Kitt Peak || Spacewatch || — || align=right data-sort-value="0.74" | 740 m || 
|-id=867 bgcolor=#E9E9E9
| 478867 ||  || — || September 27, 2008 || Mount Lemmon || Mount Lemmon Survey || — || align=right | 1.1 km || 
|-id=868 bgcolor=#E9E9E9
| 478868 ||  || — || October 23, 2012 || Kitt Peak || Spacewatch || — || align=right | 1.5 km || 
|-id=869 bgcolor=#E9E9E9
| 478869 ||  || — || October 26, 2008 || Kitt Peak || Spacewatch || fast? || align=right data-sort-value="0.85" | 850 m || 
|-id=870 bgcolor=#E9E9E9
| 478870 ||  || — || October 28, 2008 || Mount Lemmon || Mount Lemmon Survey || WIT || align=right | 1.0 km || 
|-id=871 bgcolor=#E9E9E9
| 478871 ||  || — || November 5, 2012 || Kitt Peak || Spacewatch || — || align=right | 1.5 km || 
|-id=872 bgcolor=#E9E9E9
| 478872 ||  || — || March 24, 2006 || Kitt Peak || Spacewatch || MAR || align=right | 1.1 km || 
|-id=873 bgcolor=#E9E9E9
| 478873 ||  || — || November 21, 2004 || Campo Imperatore || CINEOS || — || align=right | 1.00 km || 
|-id=874 bgcolor=#E9E9E9
| 478874 ||  || — || September 15, 2012 || Mount Lemmon || Mount Lemmon Survey || (1547) || align=right | 1.5 km || 
|-id=875 bgcolor=#E9E9E9
| 478875 ||  || — || June 4, 2011 || Kitt Peak || Spacewatch || ADE || align=right | 2.0 km || 
|-id=876 bgcolor=#E9E9E9
| 478876 ||  || — || September 28, 1994 || Kitt Peak || Spacewatch || — || align=right | 1.3 km || 
|-id=877 bgcolor=#E9E9E9
| 478877 ||  || — || November 5, 2012 || Kitt Peak || Spacewatch || — || align=right | 1.4 km || 
|-id=878 bgcolor=#E9E9E9
| 478878 ||  || — || October 20, 2003 || Kitt Peak || Spacewatch || — || align=right | 1.8 km || 
|-id=879 bgcolor=#E9E9E9
| 478879 ||  || — || March 18, 2010 || Kitt Peak || Spacewatch || — || align=right | 1.3 km || 
|-id=880 bgcolor=#E9E9E9
| 478880 ||  || — || April 30, 2006 || Kitt Peak || Spacewatch || — || align=right | 1.7 km || 
|-id=881 bgcolor=#d6d6d6
| 478881 ||  || — || September 18, 2012 || Mount Lemmon || Mount Lemmon Survey || BRA || align=right | 1.5 km || 
|-id=882 bgcolor=#E9E9E9
| 478882 ||  || — || January 1, 2009 || Mount Lemmon || Mount Lemmon Survey || — || align=right | 1.6 km || 
|-id=883 bgcolor=#d6d6d6
| 478883 ||  || — || October 23, 2012 || Mount Lemmon || Mount Lemmon Survey || — || align=right | 2.6 km || 
|-id=884 bgcolor=#E9E9E9
| 478884 ||  || — || October 23, 2012 || Mount Lemmon || Mount Lemmon Survey || DOR || align=right | 2.0 km || 
|-id=885 bgcolor=#E9E9E9
| 478885 ||  || — || November 7, 2012 || Mount Lemmon || Mount Lemmon Survey || EUN || align=right | 1.3 km || 
|-id=886 bgcolor=#E9E9E9
| 478886 ||  || — || January 3, 2009 || Kitt Peak || Spacewatch || — || align=right | 2.0 km || 
|-id=887 bgcolor=#E9E9E9
| 478887 ||  || — || October 29, 2003 || Kitt Peak || Spacewatch || — || align=right | 2.7 km || 
|-id=888 bgcolor=#E9E9E9
| 478888 ||  || — || December 6, 2000 || Kitt Peak || Spacewatch || — || align=right data-sort-value="0.84" | 840 m || 
|-id=889 bgcolor=#E9E9E9
| 478889 ||  || — || March 17, 2005 || Kitt Peak || Spacewatch || — || align=right | 1.4 km || 
|-id=890 bgcolor=#E9E9E9
| 478890 ||  || — || November 19, 2008 || Mount Lemmon || Mount Lemmon Survey || — || align=right data-sort-value="0.75" | 750 m || 
|-id=891 bgcolor=#E9E9E9
| 478891 ||  || — || March 13, 2010 || Mount Lemmon || Mount Lemmon Survey || — || align=right data-sort-value="0.94" | 940 m || 
|-id=892 bgcolor=#E9E9E9
| 478892 ||  || — || October 22, 2012 || Mount Lemmon || Mount Lemmon Survey || — || align=right | 2.4 km || 
|-id=893 bgcolor=#E9E9E9
| 478893 ||  || — || December 31, 2008 || Kitt Peak || Spacewatch || AGN || align=right | 1.1 km || 
|-id=894 bgcolor=#E9E9E9
| 478894 ||  || — || November 29, 2000 || Anderson Mesa || LONEOS || — || align=right | 1.5 km || 
|-id=895 bgcolor=#E9E9E9
| 478895 ||  || — || October 21, 2003 || Kitt Peak || Spacewatch || EUN || align=right | 1.0 km || 
|-id=896 bgcolor=#d6d6d6
| 478896 ||  || — || November 2, 2007 || Kitt Peak || Spacewatch || — || align=right | 2.6 km || 
|-id=897 bgcolor=#E9E9E9
| 478897 ||  || — || January 1, 2009 || Mount Lemmon || Mount Lemmon Survey || MRX || align=right data-sort-value="0.93" | 930 m || 
|-id=898 bgcolor=#E9E9E9
| 478898 ||  || — || March 23, 2006 || Kitt Peak || Spacewatch || — || align=right | 1.9 km || 
|-id=899 bgcolor=#E9E9E9
| 478899 ||  || — || December 30, 2008 || Mount Lemmon || Mount Lemmon Survey || — || align=right | 1.8 km || 
|-id=900 bgcolor=#E9E9E9
| 478900 ||  || — || November 20, 2003 || Kitt Peak || Spacewatch || — || align=right | 1.5 km || 
|}

478901–479000 

|-bgcolor=#E9E9E9
| 478901 ||  || — || October 23, 1995 || Kitt Peak || Spacewatch || — || align=right data-sort-value="0.79" | 790 m || 
|-id=902 bgcolor=#E9E9E9
| 478902 ||  || — || September 14, 2007 || Kitt Peak || Spacewatch || — || align=right | 1.9 km || 
|-id=903 bgcolor=#E9E9E9
| 478903 ||  || — || December 19, 2004 || Mount Lemmon || Mount Lemmon Survey || (5) || align=right data-sort-value="0.89" | 890 m || 
|-id=904 bgcolor=#E9E9E9
| 478904 ||  || — || June 24, 2011 || Mount Lemmon || Mount Lemmon Survey || — || align=right | 1.1 km || 
|-id=905 bgcolor=#E9E9E9
| 478905 ||  || — || December 2, 2008 || Kitt Peak || Spacewatch || — || align=right data-sort-value="0.87" | 870 m || 
|-id=906 bgcolor=#E9E9E9
| 478906 ||  || — || February 4, 2005 || Mount Lemmon || Mount Lemmon Survey || — || align=right | 1.1 km || 
|-id=907 bgcolor=#E9E9E9
| 478907 ||  || — || December 1, 2008 || Mount Lemmon || Mount Lemmon Survey || — || align=right | 1.5 km || 
|-id=908 bgcolor=#d6d6d6
| 478908 ||  || — || November 2, 2011 || Mount Lemmon || Mount Lemmon Survey || VER || align=right | 2.8 km || 
|-id=909 bgcolor=#E9E9E9
| 478909 ||  || — || February 2, 2009 || Mount Lemmon || Mount Lemmon Survey || — || align=right | 1.5 km || 
|-id=910 bgcolor=#E9E9E9
| 478910 ||  || — || November 23, 2008 || Kitt Peak || Spacewatch || — || align=right data-sort-value="0.93" | 930 m || 
|-id=911 bgcolor=#E9E9E9
| 478911 ||  || — || September 4, 2008 || Kitt Peak || Spacewatch || — || align=right | 1.2 km || 
|-id=912 bgcolor=#E9E9E9
| 478912 ||  || — || September 16, 2003 || Kitt Peak || Spacewatch || — || align=right | 1.2 km || 
|-id=913 bgcolor=#E9E9E9
| 478913 ||  || — || December 2, 2012 || Mount Lemmon || Mount Lemmon Survey || — || align=right | 1.4 km || 
|-id=914 bgcolor=#E9E9E9
| 478914 ||  || — || September 18, 2007 || Kitt Peak || Spacewatch || — || align=right | 2.3 km || 
|-id=915 bgcolor=#E9E9E9
| 478915 ||  || — || November 19, 1995 || Kitt Peak || Spacewatch || EUN || align=right | 1.1 km || 
|-id=916 bgcolor=#E9E9E9
| 478916 ||  || — || November 23, 2012 || Kitt Peak || Spacewatch || GEF || align=right | 1.2 km || 
|-id=917 bgcolor=#E9E9E9
| 478917 ||  || — || January 2, 2009 || Mount Lemmon || Mount Lemmon Survey || — || align=right data-sort-value="0.78" | 780 m || 
|-id=918 bgcolor=#E9E9E9
| 478918 ||  || — || December 1, 2008 || Kitt Peak || Spacewatch || (5) || align=right data-sort-value="0.80" | 800 m || 
|-id=919 bgcolor=#E9E9E9
| 478919 ||  || — || January 16, 2009 || Kitt Peak || Spacewatch || — || align=right | 1.6 km || 
|-id=920 bgcolor=#E9E9E9
| 478920 ||  || — || November 21, 2003 || Socorro || LINEAR || EUN || align=right | 1.3 km || 
|-id=921 bgcolor=#E9E9E9
| 478921 ||  || — || November 26, 2003 || Kitt Peak || Spacewatch || — || align=right | 2.4 km || 
|-id=922 bgcolor=#E9E9E9
| 478922 ||  || — || April 14, 2010 || Kitt Peak || Spacewatch || — || align=right | 1.4 km || 
|-id=923 bgcolor=#fefefe
| 478923 ||  || — || February 27, 2006 || Kitt Peak || Spacewatch || — || align=right data-sort-value="0.80" | 800 m || 
|-id=924 bgcolor=#E9E9E9
| 478924 ||  || — || November 23, 2012 || Kitt Peak || Spacewatch || — || align=right | 1.4 km || 
|-id=925 bgcolor=#E9E9E9
| 478925 ||  || — || April 7, 2006 || Kitt Peak || Spacewatch || — || align=right | 1.7 km || 
|-id=926 bgcolor=#E9E9E9
| 478926 ||  || — || September 21, 2003 || Kitt Peak || Spacewatch || — || align=right | 1.3 km || 
|-id=927 bgcolor=#E9E9E9
| 478927 ||  || — || September 14, 2007 || Mount Lemmon || Mount Lemmon Survey || — || align=right | 1.5 km || 
|-id=928 bgcolor=#E9E9E9
| 478928 ||  || — || October 20, 2012 || Kitt Peak || Spacewatch || — || align=right | 1.1 km || 
|-id=929 bgcolor=#E9E9E9
| 478929 ||  || — || October 13, 2007 || Kitt Peak || Spacewatch || AGN || align=right | 1.0 km || 
|-id=930 bgcolor=#E9E9E9
| 478930 ||  || — || September 17, 2003 || Kitt Peak || Spacewatch || — || align=right data-sort-value="0.93" | 930 m || 
|-id=931 bgcolor=#E9E9E9
| 478931 ||  || — || December 22, 2008 || Kitt Peak || Spacewatch || — || align=right | 1.5 km || 
|-id=932 bgcolor=#E9E9E9
| 478932 ||  || — || October 28, 2008 || Mount Lemmon || Mount Lemmon Survey || EUN || align=right | 1.1 km || 
|-id=933 bgcolor=#E9E9E9
| 478933 ||  || — || February 2, 2009 || Catalina || CSS || — || align=right | 2.1 km || 
|-id=934 bgcolor=#E9E9E9
| 478934 ||  || — || May 21, 2006 || Kitt Peak || Spacewatch || — || align=right | 1.5 km || 
|-id=935 bgcolor=#E9E9E9
| 478935 ||  || — || November 30, 2008 || Kitt Peak || Spacewatch || — || align=right | 1.00 km || 
|-id=936 bgcolor=#E9E9E9
| 478936 ||  || — || September 18, 2003 || Kitt Peak || Spacewatch || — || align=right | 1.3 km || 
|-id=937 bgcolor=#E9E9E9
| 478937 ||  || — || November 7, 2012 || Mount Lemmon || Mount Lemmon Survey || — || align=right | 2.8 km || 
|-id=938 bgcolor=#E9E9E9
| 478938 ||  || — || December 21, 2008 || Kitt Peak || Spacewatch || — || align=right | 1.5 km || 
|-id=939 bgcolor=#E9E9E9
| 478939 ||  || — || November 7, 2012 || Mount Lemmon || Mount Lemmon Survey || — || align=right | 1.3 km || 
|-id=940 bgcolor=#E9E9E9
| 478940 ||  || — || November 18, 2008 || Kitt Peak || Spacewatch || — || align=right | 1.0 km || 
|-id=941 bgcolor=#d6d6d6
| 478941 ||  || — || November 12, 2012 || Mount Lemmon || Mount Lemmon Survey || — || align=right | 3.1 km || 
|-id=942 bgcolor=#E9E9E9
| 478942 ||  || — || December 13, 1999 || Kitt Peak || Spacewatch || (1547) || align=right | 1.5 km || 
|-id=943 bgcolor=#E9E9E9
| 478943 ||  || — || November 30, 2008 || Kitt Peak || Spacewatch || (5) || align=right data-sort-value="0.88" | 880 m || 
|-id=944 bgcolor=#E9E9E9
| 478944 ||  || — || October 24, 1995 || Kitt Peak || Spacewatch || — || align=right data-sort-value="0.81" | 810 m || 
|-id=945 bgcolor=#E9E9E9
| 478945 ||  || — || December 1, 2008 || Mount Lemmon || Mount Lemmon Survey || ADE || align=right | 1.8 km || 
|-id=946 bgcolor=#E9E9E9
| 478946 ||  || — || September 19, 2003 || Kitt Peak || Spacewatch || — || align=right | 1.5 km || 
|-id=947 bgcolor=#E9E9E9
| 478947 ||  || — || October 14, 2012 || Kitt Peak || Spacewatch || — || align=right | 2.0 km || 
|-id=948 bgcolor=#E9E9E9
| 478948 ||  || — || November 13, 2012 || Mount Lemmon || Mount Lemmon Survey || (5) || align=right data-sort-value="0.80" | 800 m || 
|-id=949 bgcolor=#E9E9E9
| 478949 ||  || — || December 4, 2012 || Mount Lemmon || Mount Lemmon Survey || — || align=right | 1.9 km || 
|-id=950 bgcolor=#E9E9E9
| 478950 ||  || — || September 11, 2007 || Mount Lemmon || Mount Lemmon Survey || AGN || align=right | 1.1 km || 
|-id=951 bgcolor=#E9E9E9
| 478951 ||  || — || October 17, 2012 || Mount Lemmon || Mount Lemmon Survey || — || align=right | 2.0 km || 
|-id=952 bgcolor=#E9E9E9
| 478952 ||  || — || December 15, 2004 || Kitt Peak || Spacewatch || (5) || align=right data-sort-value="0.73" | 730 m || 
|-id=953 bgcolor=#E9E9E9
| 478953 ||  || — || June 25, 2010 || WISE || WISE || — || align=right | 3.7 km || 
|-id=954 bgcolor=#E9E9E9
| 478954 ||  || — || September 13, 2007 || Mount Lemmon || Mount Lemmon Survey || — || align=right | 2.2 km || 
|-id=955 bgcolor=#E9E9E9
| 478955 ||  || — || November 12, 2012 || Mount Lemmon || Mount Lemmon Survey || — || align=right | 1.2 km || 
|-id=956 bgcolor=#E9E9E9
| 478956 ||  || — || December 16, 2003 || Kitt Peak || Spacewatch || — || align=right | 2.6 km || 
|-id=957 bgcolor=#E9E9E9
| 478957 ||  || — || May 11, 2010 || Mount Lemmon || Mount Lemmon Survey || — || align=right | 1.8 km || 
|-id=958 bgcolor=#E9E9E9
| 478958 ||  || — || June 12, 2011 || Catalina || CSS || — || align=right | 1.5 km || 
|-id=959 bgcolor=#E9E9E9
| 478959 ||  || — || November 8, 2008 || Mount Lemmon || Mount Lemmon Survey || — || align=right | 1.8 km || 
|-id=960 bgcolor=#E9E9E9
| 478960 ||  || — || January 19, 2001 || Kitt Peak || Spacewatch || (5) || align=right data-sort-value="0.74" | 740 m || 
|-id=961 bgcolor=#E9E9E9
| 478961 ||  || — || October 26, 2008 || Mount Lemmon || Mount Lemmon Survey || — || align=right data-sort-value="0.87" | 870 m || 
|-id=962 bgcolor=#E9E9E9
| 478962 ||  || — || March 5, 2006 || Mount Lemmon || Mount Lemmon Survey || MAR || align=right | 1.1 km || 
|-id=963 bgcolor=#E9E9E9
| 478963 ||  || — || February 3, 2000 || Kitt Peak || Spacewatch || — || align=right | 1.1 km || 
|-id=964 bgcolor=#E9E9E9
| 478964 ||  || — || March 4, 2005 || Mount Lemmon || Mount Lemmon Survey || — || align=right | 1.1 km || 
|-id=965 bgcolor=#E9E9E9
| 478965 ||  || — || November 10, 1999 || Kitt Peak || Spacewatch || EUN || align=right | 1.3 km || 
|-id=966 bgcolor=#E9E9E9
| 478966 ||  || — || September 27, 2008 || Mount Lemmon || Mount Lemmon Survey || — || align=right data-sort-value="0.75" | 750 m || 
|-id=967 bgcolor=#E9E9E9
| 478967 ||  || — || November 23, 2008 || Kitt Peak || Spacewatch || — || align=right | 1.0 km || 
|-id=968 bgcolor=#E9E9E9
| 478968 ||  || — || November 1, 2008 || Mount Lemmon || Mount Lemmon Survey || — || align=right | 1.5 km || 
|-id=969 bgcolor=#E9E9E9
| 478969 ||  || — || October 15, 2007 || Kitt Peak || Spacewatch || — || align=right | 1.9 km || 
|-id=970 bgcolor=#E9E9E9
| 478970 ||  || — || September 13, 2007 || Mount Lemmon || Mount Lemmon Survey || — || align=right | 1.8 km || 
|-id=971 bgcolor=#E9E9E9
| 478971 ||  || — || September 4, 2007 || Mount Lemmon || Mount Lemmon Survey || — || align=right | 1.0 km || 
|-id=972 bgcolor=#E9E9E9
| 478972 ||  || — || November 4, 2012 || Kitt Peak || Spacewatch || — || align=right data-sort-value="0.99" | 990 m || 
|-id=973 bgcolor=#E9E9E9
| 478973 ||  || — || September 13, 2007 || Mount Lemmon || Mount Lemmon Survey || — || align=right | 1.8 km || 
|-id=974 bgcolor=#E9E9E9
| 478974 ||  || — || February 20, 2009 || Siding Spring || SSS || — || align=right | 3.6 km || 
|-id=975 bgcolor=#E9E9E9
| 478975 ||  || — || October 3, 2008 || Mount Lemmon || Mount Lemmon Survey || — || align=right | 1.6 km || 
|-id=976 bgcolor=#E9E9E9
| 478976 ||  || — || September 14, 2007 || Catalina || CSS || — || align=right | 1.9 km || 
|-id=977 bgcolor=#d6d6d6
| 478977 ||  || — || November 12, 2012 || Mount Lemmon || Mount Lemmon Survey || TIR || align=right | 2.8 km || 
|-id=978 bgcolor=#E9E9E9
| 478978 ||  || — || November 19, 2003 || Socorro || LINEAR || — || align=right | 2.2 km || 
|-id=979 bgcolor=#d6d6d6
| 478979 ||  || — || December 8, 2012 || Mount Lemmon || Mount Lemmon Survey || — || align=right | 2.5 km || 
|-id=980 bgcolor=#FA8072
| 478980 ||  || — || May 4, 2009 || Siding Spring || SSS || — || align=right | 1.7 km || 
|-id=981 bgcolor=#E9E9E9
| 478981 ||  || — || October 20, 2007 || Mount Lemmon || Mount Lemmon Survey || — || align=right | 1.9 km || 
|-id=982 bgcolor=#E9E9E9
| 478982 ||  || — || December 27, 2003 || Kitt Peak || Spacewatch || — || align=right | 2.0 km || 
|-id=983 bgcolor=#E9E9E9
| 478983 ||  || — || January 31, 2009 || Mount Lemmon || Mount Lemmon Survey || — || align=right | 2.0 km || 
|-id=984 bgcolor=#E9E9E9
| 478984 ||  || — || November 8, 2007 || Mount Lemmon || Mount Lemmon Survey || — || align=right | 1.8 km || 
|-id=985 bgcolor=#E9E9E9
| 478985 ||  || — || November 9, 2007 || Kitt Peak || Spacewatch || MRX || align=right data-sort-value="0.87" | 870 m || 
|-id=986 bgcolor=#E9E9E9
| 478986 ||  || — || November 30, 2008 || Kitt Peak || Spacewatch || — || align=right data-sort-value="0.87" | 870 m || 
|-id=987 bgcolor=#E9E9E9
| 478987 ||  || — || December 9, 2012 || Kitt Peak || Spacewatch || — || align=right | 2.2 km || 
|-id=988 bgcolor=#d6d6d6
| 478988 ||  || — || November 12, 2012 || Mount Lemmon || Mount Lemmon Survey || EOS || align=right | 1.5 km || 
|-id=989 bgcolor=#E9E9E9
| 478989 ||  || — || November 20, 2008 || Mount Lemmon || Mount Lemmon Survey || EUN || align=right | 1.0 km || 
|-id=990 bgcolor=#E9E9E9
| 478990 ||  || — || November 26, 2012 || Mount Lemmon || Mount Lemmon Survey || — || align=right | 1.5 km || 
|-id=991 bgcolor=#E9E9E9
| 478991 ||  || — || September 22, 1995 || Kitt Peak || Spacewatch || — || align=right data-sort-value="0.75" | 750 m || 
|-id=992 bgcolor=#E9E9E9
| 478992 ||  || — || October 27, 2003 || Kitt Peak || Spacewatch || — || align=right | 2.0 km || 
|-id=993 bgcolor=#E9E9E9
| 478993 ||  || — || October 25, 2008 || Kitt Peak || Spacewatch || — || align=right | 1.0 km || 
|-id=994 bgcolor=#E9E9E9
| 478994 ||  || — || March 21, 2009 || Catalina || CSS || — || align=right | 2.0 km || 
|-id=995 bgcolor=#E9E9E9
| 478995 ||  || — || December 4, 2012 || Mount Lemmon || Mount Lemmon Survey || MAR || align=right | 1.2 km || 
|-id=996 bgcolor=#E9E9E9
| 478996 ||  || — || October 16, 1995 || Kitt Peak || Spacewatch || (5)critical || align=right data-sort-value="0.51" | 510 m || 
|-id=997 bgcolor=#FA8072
| 478997 ||  || — || March 22, 2009 || Catalina || CSS || — || align=right data-sort-value="0.91" | 910 m || 
|-id=998 bgcolor=#E9E9E9
| 478998 ||  || — || January 29, 2009 || Mount Lemmon || Mount Lemmon Survey || — || align=right | 1.7 km || 
|-id=999 bgcolor=#E9E9E9
| 478999 ||  || — || September 7, 2008 || Mount Lemmon || Mount Lemmon Survey || — || align=right | 1.0 km || 
|-id=000 bgcolor=#E9E9E9
| 479000 ||  || — || December 22, 2008 || Mount Lemmon || Mount Lemmon Survey || — || align=right | 1.5 km || 
|}

References

External links 
 Discovery Circumstances: Numbered Minor Planets (475001)–(480000) (IAU Minor Planet Center)

0478